

N

N. a pris les dés... (1971)
N - The Madness of Reason (2014)
N is a Number: A Portrait of Paul Erdős (1993)
N!ai, the Story of a !Kung Woman (1980)
NASCAR 3D: The IMAX Experience (2004)
NCR: Not Criminally Responsible (2013)
N.G.O (1967)
NH-8 Road to Nidhivan (2015)
NH 47 (1984) 
NN (2014)
NOTA (2018)
N.T.R: Kathanayakudu (2019)
N.T.R: Mahanayakudu (2019)
N.U. (1948)
NVA (2005)
NWF Kids Pro Wrestling: The Untold Story (2005)
The N-Word (2004)
NY77: The Coolest Year in Hell (2007)
NYC: Tornado Terror (2008)
N.Y.H.C. (1999)
N.Y., N.Y. (1957)

Na

Na Band Na Baraati (2018)
Na białym szlaku (1962)
Na Bolona (2006)
Na Ghar Ke Na Ghaat Ke (2010)
Na Hannyate (2012)
Na istarski način (1985)
Na konci města (1955)
Na Maloom Afraad series:
Na Maloom Afraad (2014)
Na Maloom Afraad 2 (2017)
Na Ninna Preetisuve (1986)
Na odsiecz Wiedniowi (1983)
Na pytlácké stezce (1979)
Na růžích ustláno (1935)
Na Svatém Kopečku (1934)
Na svoji zemlji (1948)
Na Tum Jaano Na Hum (2002)
Na Wewe (2010)

Naa

Naa Alludu (2005)
Naa Autograph (2004)
Naa Bangaaru Talli (2013)
Naa Desam (1982)
Naa Illu (1953)
Naa Ishtam (2012) 
Naa Mechida Huduga (1972)
Naa Ninna Bidalaare (1979)
Naa Ninna Mareyalare (1976)
Naa... Nuvve (2018)
Naa Peru Surya, Naa Illu India (2018)
Naach (2004)
Naach Govinda Naach (1992)
Naach Uthe Sansaar (1976)
Naache Mayuri (1986)
Naachiyaar (2018)
Naadan Pennu (1967)
Naadan Premam (1972)
Naadi Aada Janme (1965)
Naadodigal series:
Naadodigal (2009)
Naadodigal 2 (2019)
Naadodikal (1959)
Naadu Adhai Naadu (1991)
Naag Nagin (1990)
Naag aur Nagin (2005)
Naaga (2003)
Naaga Nandhini (1961)
Naagam: (1985 & 1991)
Naagamalai Azhagi (1962)
Naagarahaavu (1972)
Naagdev (2018)
Naagu (1984)
Naai Kutty (2009)
Naaigal Jaakirathai (2014)
Naajayaz (1995)
Naakaa (2018)
Naal (2018)
Naal Natchathiram (2009)
Naalaaga Endaro (1978)
Naalai (2006)
Naalai Manithan (1989)
Naalai Namadhe: (1975 & 2009)
Naalai Unathu Naal (1984)
Naalaiya Pozhuthum Unnodu (2007)
Naalaiya Theerpu (1992)
Naalaya Seidhi (1992)
Naale (2008)
Naale Ennundengil (1990)
Naale Njangalude Vivaham (1986)
Naalkavala (1987) 
Naalo Unna Prema (2001)
Naalu Pennungal (2007)
Naalu Peruku Nalladhuna Edhuvum Thappilla (2017)
Naalu Policeum Nalla Irundha Oorum (2015)
Naalu Veli Nilam (1959)
Naalum Therindhavan (1968)
Naalumanippookkal (1978)
Naalvar (1953)
Naam: (1953, 1986, 2003 & 2018)
Naam Gum Jaayega (2005)
Naam Iruvar: (1947 & 1985)
Naam Iruvar Namakku Iruvar (1998)
Naam Moovar (1966)
Naam O Nishan (1987)
Naam Pirandha Mann (1977)
Naam Shabana (2017)
Naamcheen (1991)
Naami Chor (1977)
Naan: (1967 & 2012)
Naan Aanaiyittal (1966)
Naan Adimai Illai (1986)
Naan Aval Adhu (unreleased)
Naan Avalai Sandhitha Pothu (2019)
Naan Avanillai: (1974 & 2007)
Naan Avanillai 2 (2009)
Naan Kadavul (2009)
Naan Kanda Sorgam (1960)
Naan Mahaan Alla: (1984 & 2010)
Naan Paadum Paadal (1984)
Naan Pesa Ninaipathellam (1993)
Naan Petha Magane (1995)
Naan Petra Selvam (1956)
Naan Potta Savaal (1980)
Naan Rajavaga Pogiren (2013)
Naan Sigappu Manithan: (1985 & 2014)
Naan Sollum Ragasiyam (1959)
Naan Sonnathey Sattam (1988)
Naan Thaan Siva (2013)
Naan Than Bala (2014)
Naan Ungal Thozhan (1978)
Naan Valartha Thangai (1958)
Naan Vanangum Dheivam (1963)
Naan Vazhavaippen (1979)
Naan Yen Pirandhen (1972)
Naanal (1965)
Naanayam: (1983 & 2010)
Naandhi (2021)
Naandi (1964)
Naane Bhagyavati (1968)
Naane Ennul Illai (2010)
Naane Raja: (1956 & 1984)
Naane Raja Naane Mandhiri (1985)
Naane Varuven (1992)
Naanga (2012)
Naanga Romba Busy (2020)
Naangal (1992)
Naangu Killadigal (1969)
Naangu Suvargal (1971)
Naani (2004)
Naanna Nenu Naa Boyfriends (2016)
Naanu Avanalla...Avalu (2015)
Naanu Mattu Varalakshmi (2016)
Naanu Naane (2002)
Naanu Nanna Hendthi (1985)
Naanu Nanna Kanasu (2010)
Naanum Indha Ooruthan (1990)
Naanum Oru Penn (1963)
Naanum Oru Thozhilali (1986)
Naanum Rowdy Dhaan (2015)
Naaraayam (1993)
Narappa (2021)
Naari (1963)
Naariya Seere Kadda (2010)
Naatak (1947)
Naattiya Rani (1949)
Naatukoru Nallaval (1959)
Naaummeedhu (2001)
Naavadakku Paniyedukku (1985)
Naayak (2013)
Naayattu (1980)
Naayi Neralu (2006)
Naayika (2011)
Naayudamma (2006)

Nab–Naf

Nabab (2016)
Nabab LLB (2020)
Nabab Nandini (2007)
Nabat (2014)
Nabbie's Love (1999)
Nabi (2001)
Nabin Jatra (1953)
The Nabob Affair (1960)
Nabonga (1944)
Nace un campeón (1952)
Nachavule (2008)
Nache Nagin Gali Gali (1989)
Nacher Putul (1971)
Nacho Libre (2006)
Nacholer Rani (2006)
Nachom-ia Kumpasar (2015)
Nachtrit (2006)
Nachtvlinder (1999)
Nacidos para cantar (1965)
Nad Niemnem (1986)
Nada: (1947 & 1974)
Nada más que amor (1942)
Nada Sōsō (2006)
Nada Untuk Asa (2015)
Nada's Revolution (2015)
Nadaan: (1943 & 1971)
Nadakame Ulakam (2011)
Nadan (2013)
Nadan Pennum Natupramaniyum (2000)
Nadhi Karaiyinile (2003)
Nadhiyai Thedi Vandha Kadal (1980)
Nadi Theke Sagare (1978) 
Nadi Vahate (2017)
Nadia (1984)
Nadia, Butterfly (2020)
Nadia and the Hippos (1999)
Nadia's Friends (2006)
Nadie dijo nada (1971)
Nadie oyó gritar (1973)
Nadie oyó gritar a Cecilio Fuentes (1965)
Nadie te querra como yo (1972)
Nadigai (2008)
Nadigan (1990)
Nadina Bhagya (1970)
Nadine (1987)
Nadiya Ke Paar: (1948 & 1982)
Nadiya Kollappetta Rathri (2007)
Nadja (1994)
Nadodi (1966)
Nadodi Mannan: (1958 & 1995)
Nadodi Pattukkaran (1992)
Nadodi Raja (1982)
Nadodi Thendral (1992)
Nadodikkattu (1987)
Nadodimannan (2013)
Nadu Iravil (1970)
Nadunisi Naaygal (2011)
Naduvazhikal (1989)
Naduve Antaravirali (2018)
Naduvula Konjam Pakkatha Kaanom (2012)
Nae Pasaran (2018)
Nafrat Ki Aandhi (1989)
Nafrathu (1994)
Nafrathuvumun (2019)

Nag

Naga Kala Bhairava (1981)
Naga Kanya (2007)
Naga Panjami (1956)
Naga Story: The Other Side of Silence (2003)
Nagabonar (1987)
Nagabonar Jadi 2 (2007)
Nagai Go no Kowai Zone: Kaiki (1989)
Nagai Go no Kowai Zone 2: Senki (1990)
Nagai Go World: Maboroshi Panty VS Henchin Pokoider (2004)
Nagalingam (2000)
Nagalit ang Buwan sa Haba ng Gabi (1983)
Nagamadathu Thampuratti (1982)
Nagamandala (1997)
The Nagano Tapes: Rewound, Replayed & Reviewed (2018)
Nagara Varidhi Naduvil Njan (2014)
Nagaradalli Nayakaru (1992)
Nagarahavu: (2002 & 2016)
Nagarahole (1977)
Nagaram: (2007 & 2008)
Nagaram Marupakkam (2010)
Nagaram Nidrapotunna Vela (2009)
Nagaram Sagaram (1974)
Nagarame Nandi (1967)
Nagarangalil Chennu Raparkam (1990)
Nagarathil Samsara Vishayam (1991)
Nagaravadhu (2001)
Nagarjuna (1961)
Nagasaki: Memories of My Son (2015)
Nagavalli (2010)
Nagesh Thiraiyarangam (2018)
Nagin: (1954, 1976 & 2010)
Nagin Aur Lootere (1992)
Nagin Aur Suhagin (1979)
Nagina: (1986 & 2014)
Naglalayag (2004)
Nagmoti (1983)
Nagna Sathyam (1979)
Nagraj (2018)
Naguva Hoovu (1971)

Nah–Naj

Nahanni (1962)
Nahid (2015)
Nahla (1979)
Nahuel and the Magic Book (2020)
Nai Duniya (1942)
Nai Duniya Naye Log (1973)
Nai Kahani (1943)
Nai Maa (1946)
Nai Nabhannu La (2014)
Nai Nabhannu La 4 (2016)
Nai Nabhannu La 5 (2018)
Nai Roshni: (1941 & 1967)
Nai Umar Ki Nai Fasal (1966)
Nai Zindagi (1943)
The Nail (1944)
The Nail: The Story of Joey Nardone (2009)
Nail in the Boot (1931)
Nail Gun Massacre (1985)
Nail Polish (2021)
Nailbiter (2013)
Nails: (1979, 1992, 2003 & 2017)
Naina: (1973, 2002 & 2005)
Nainsukh (2010)
Nair Saab (1989)
Nairu Pidicha Pulivalu (1958)
Naiyaandi (2013)
Najangalude Kochu Doctor (1989)
Najma: (1943 & 1983)

Nak

Nak (2008)
Nakagawa Jun Kyōju no Inbina Hibi (2008)
Naked: (1993, 2002, 2013 & 2017)
Naked Africa (1957)
Naked Alibi (1954)
Naked Amazon (1954)
Naked Ambition (2003)
Naked Ambition 2 (2014)
Naked Ambition: An R Rated Look at an X Rated Industry (2009)
Naked Among Wolves: (1963 & 2015)
Naked Angel (2011)
The Naked Angel (1946)
Naked Angels (1969)
The Naked Ape (1973)
Naked Blood (1996)
Naked Boys Singing! (2007)
The Naked Brigade (1965)
The Naked Brothers Band: The Movie (2005)
The Naked Bunyip (1970)
The Naked Cage (1986)
Naked Campus (1982)
Naked Childhood (1968)
The Naked City (1948)
Naked City: Justice with a Bullet (1998)
The Naked Civil Servant (1975)
The Naked Country (1985)
The Naked Dawn (1955)
The Naked and the Dead (1958)
The Naked DJ (2014)
The Naked Earth (1958)
The Naked Edge (1961)
Naked Evil (1966)
The Naked Eye: (1956 & 1998)
The Naked Face (1984)
Naked Fame (2005)
The Naked Feminist (2004)
Naked Fury (1959)
Naked Girl Killed in the Park (1972)
Naked Gun (1956)
Naked Gun series:
The Naked Gun: From the Files of Police Squad! (1988)
The Naked Gun 2½: The Smell of Fear (1991)
Naked Gun : The Final Insult (1994)
Naked Harbour (2012)
The Naked Heart (1950)
Naked Hearts: (1916 & 1966)
The Naked Hills (1956)
The Naked Hours (1964) 
The Naked Island (1962)
The Naked Jungle (1954)
Naked Killer (1992)
The Naked Kiss (1964)
The Naked Kitchen (2009)
Naked Lunch (1991)
The Naked Maja (1958)
The Naked Man: (1923 & 1998)
Naked Massacre (1976)
The Naked Monster (2005)
Naked in New York (1992)
Naked Obsession (1990)
Naked Paradise (1957)
The Naked Prey (1965)
The Naked Proof (2003)
The Naked Runner (1967)
Naked Sea (1954)
Naked Soldier (2012)
Naked Souls (1996)
The Naked Spur (1953)
The Naked Street (1955)
Naked Sun (1958)
Naked in the Sun (1957)
Naked Tango (1991)
Naked Therapy (1975)
The Naked Truth: (1914, 1932, 1957 & 1992)
Naked Vengeance (1985)
Naked Violence (1969)
Naked Weapon (2002)
The Naked Witch (1964)
The Naked Woman and the Gun (1957)
The Naked World of Harrison Marks (1967)
Naked Yoga (1974)
Naked Youth (1961)
The Naked Zoo (1970)
Naken (2000)
Nakhakshathangal (1986)
Nakhangal: (1973 & 2013)
Nakharam (2011)
Nakhuda (1981)
Nakili Manishi (1980)
Nakkare Ade Swarga (1967)
Nakom (2016)
Nakshathragal Parayathirunnathu (2000)
Nakshathrakkannulla Rajakumaran Avanundoru Rajakumari (2002)
Nakshathrangale Kaaval (1978)
Nakshatra (2010)
Nakshatram (2017)
Nakshatratharattu (1998)
Naku Penta Naku Taka (2014)

Nal

Nala Damayanthi: (1959 & 2003)
Nalanum Nandhiniyum (2014)
Nalayak (1978)
Nalini by Day, Nancy by Night (2005)
Nalla (2004)
Nalla Idathu Sammandham (1958)
Nalla Kaalam Porandaachu (1990)
Nalla Manasukkaran (1997)
Nalla Naal (1984)
Nalla Neram (1972)
Nam's Angels (1970)
Namak Haraam (1973)
Nalla Thambi (1985)
Nalla Thangai (1955)
Nalla Thangal (1955)
Nalla Thanka (1950)
Nalla Theerpu (1959)
Nalla Veedu (1956)
Nallakalam (1954)
Nallathai Naadu Kekum (1991)
Nallathambi (1949)
Nallathe Nadakkum (1993)
Nallathoru Kudumbam (1979)
Nallavan: (1955, 1988 & 2010)
Nallavan Vazhvan (1961)
Nallavanukku Nallavan (1984)
Nalugu Stambhalata (1982)
Nalvaravu (1964)

Nam

Nam Duniya Nam Style (2013)
Nam Kuzhandai (1955)
Nam Naadu: (1969 & 2007)
Nam's Angels (1970)
Namak (1996)
Namak Halaal (1982)
Namak Haraam (1973)
Namaste England (2018)
Namaste Madam (2014) 
Namastey London (2007)
Namasthe Bali (2015)
Namath: From Beaver Falls to Broadway (2012)
Namatjira the Painter (1947)
Nambinar Keduvathillai (1986)
Nambiyaar (2016)
Nambugun (1990)
Namdev Bhau: In Search of Silence (2018)
A Name for Evil (1973)
Name the Man (1924)
The Name of the Rose (1986)
Nameless (1923)
The Nameless (1999)
A Nameless Band (1982)
Nameless Gangster: Rules of the Time (2012)
Nameless Heroes (1925)
The Nameless Knight (1970)
Nameless Men (1928)
Nameless Star (1979)
Nameless Woman (1927)
The Names of Love (2010)
Names in Marble (2002)
The Namesake (2006)
Nami (1951)
Namibia: The Struggle for Liberation (2007)
Namitha I Love You (2011)
Namiya (2017)
Namkeen (1982)
Namma Annachi (1994)
Namma Basava (2005)
Namma Kuzhandaigal (1970)
Namma Makkalu (1969)
Namma Ooru Mariamma (1991)
Namma Ooru Nalla Ooru (1986)
Namma Ooru Nayagan (1988)
Namma Ooru Poovatha (1990)
Namma Ooru Raasa (1996)
Namma Preethiya Ramu (2003)
Namma Samsara (1971)
Namma Veettu Lakshmi (1966)
Namma Veetu Kalyanam (2002)
Nammal (2002)
Nammal Thammil (2009)
Nammanna (2005)
Nammanna Don (2012)
Nammavar (1994)
Namme (2017)
Nammina Bantu (1960)
Nammoora Hammera (1990)
Nammoora Mandara Hoove (1997)
Nammoora Raja (1988)
Nammude Naadu (1990)
Namo Bhootatma (2014)
Namo Venkatesa (2010)
Namte Namte (2013)
Namu, the Killer Whale (1966)
Namukku Parkkan (2012)
Namukku Parkkan Munthirithoppukal (1986)
Namus (1925)

Nan

Nan Hendthi Chennagidale (2000)
Nan Love Track (2016)
Nan of Music Mountain (1917)
Nan of the North (1922)
Nan O' the Backwoods (1915)
Nana: (1926, 1934, 1944, 1955, 1985 & 2005)
Nana 2 (2006)
Nana - A Tale of Us (2017)
Nana to Kaoru series:
Nana to Kaoru (2011) 
Nana to Kaoru: Chapter 2 (2012)
Nana Means King (2015)
Nana, the True Key of Pleasure (1982)
Nanak Nam Jahaz Hai (1969)
Nanak Shah Fakir (2018)
Nanayam (1983)
Nanba Nanba (2002)
Nanban: (1954 & 2012)
Nanbanin Kadhali (2007)
Nanbargal (1991)
Nance (1920)
Nancy (2018)
Nancy Bikin Pembalesan (1930)
Nancy Drew: (2002 TV & 2007)
Nancy Drew... Detective (1938)
Nancy Drew and the Hidden Staircase: (1939 & 2019)
Nancy Drew... Reporter (1939)
Nancy Drew... Trouble Shooter (1939)
Nancy Goes to Rio (1950)
Nancy from Nowhere (1922)
Nancy, Please (2012)
Nanda (2009)
Nanda Deepa (1963)
Nanda Gokula (1972)
Nanda Loves Nanditha (2008)
Nandakumar (1938)
Nandalala (2010)
Nandanam (2002)
Nandanar (1942)
Nandanavanam 120km (2006)
Nandeeswarudu (2012)
Nandha (2001)
Nandhavana Theru (1995)
Nandhi: (2002 & 2011)
Nandhini (1997)
Nandi Veendum Varika (1986)
Nandini I Love U (2008)
Nandini Oppol (1994)
Nandito Ako Nagmamahal Sa'Yo (2009)
Nandri (1984)
Nandri, Meendum Varuga (1982)
Nandu (1981)
Nanendu Nimmavane (1993)
Nanette (1940)
Nanette Makes Everything (1926)
Nanette of the Wilds (1916)
Nang Iniwan Mo Ako (1997) 
Nang Mahawi ang Ulap (1940)
Nang Nak (1999)
Nanga Parbat (2010)
Nangal Puthiyavargal (1990)
Nangna Kappa Pakchade (2013)
Nangna Nokpa Yengningi (2015)
Nangoku no hada (1952)
Naniruvude Ninagagi (1979)
Nanjundi (2003)
Nanjundi Kalyana (1989)
Nanjupuram (2011)
Nankana (2018)
Nanking: (1938 & 2007)
Nanma (2007)
Nanna Kartavya (1965)
Nanna Ninna Prema Kathe (2016)
Nanna Prathigne (1985)
Nanna Prayaschittha (1978)
Nanna Preethiya Hudugi (2001)
Nanna Rosha Nooru Varusha (1980)
Nanna Shathru (1992)
Nanna Thamma (1970)
Nannaku Prematho (2016)
Nannambikkai (1956)
Nannavanu (2010)
Nannbenda (2015)
Nannu Dochukunduvate (2018)
Nanny (2022)
The Nanny: (1965 & 1999)
A Nanny for Christmas (2010)
The Nanny Diaries (2007)
Nanny McPhee (2005)
Nanny McPhee and the Big Bang (2010)
Nanny and the Professor (1972)
Nanobba Kalla (1979)
Nanon: (1924 & 1938)
Nanook of the North (1922)
Nanou (1986)
Nanu Ki Jaanu (2018)

Nao–Naq

Naomi and Ely's No Kiss List (2015)
Naomi & Wynonna: Love Can Build a Bridge (1995)
Naples in Green and Blue (1935)
Naples of Olden Times (1938)
Naples is a Song (1927)
Naples Sings (1953)
Naples Will Never Die (1939)
Napló apámnak, anyámnak (1990)
Napoleon: (1927, 1951, 1955, 1995, 2007 TV & 2023)
Napoléon II l'Aiglon (1961)
Napoleon Bunny-Part (1956)
Napoleon Dynamite (2004)
Napoleon Is to Blame for Everything (1938)
Napoleon and Josephine: A Love Story (1987)
Napoleon and Me (2006)
Napoleon Road (1953)
Napoleon and Samantha (1972)
Napoleon and the Little Washerwoman (1920)
Napoleon at Saint Helena (1929)
Napoleon's Barber (1928)
Napoleon's Daughter (1922)
Napoli, Napoli, Napoli (2009)
Napoli piange e ride (1954)
Napoli velata (2017)
Napoli violenta (1976)
Nappily Ever After (2018)
Napping Princess (2017)
Naqaab: (2007 & 2018)
Naqoyqatsi (2002)

Nar

Narada Vijaya (1980)
Naradhan Keralathil (1987)
Naragasooran (TBD)
Narakasuran (2006)
Naram Garam (1981)
Naramsimha (1991)
Naran (2005)
Naranathu Thampuran (2001)
Narasimha: (2001 & 2012)
Narasimha Naidu (2001)
Narasimham (2000)
Narasimhudu (2005)
Narasinha Avatar (1949)
Narathan (2016)
Narayana Saw Me (2015)
Narc (2002)
Narciso's Hard Luck (1940)
Narcissus: (1983, 2012 & 2015)
Narcissus and Psyche (1980)
Narco (2004)
Narco Cultura (2013)
Narcopolis (2015)
Narcotics (1932)
The Narcotics Story (1958)
Narendran Makan Jayakanthan Vaka (2001)
Nargess (1992)
Nargis (1946)
Nari (1942)
Nari Munidare Mari (1972)
Nari Nari Naduma Murari (1990)
Nariman (2001)
Narito ang Puso Ko (1992)
Narmada: A Valley Rises (1994)
A Narmada Diary (1995)
Narradores de Javé (2003)
The Narrow Corner (1933)
Narrow Margin (1990)
The Narrow Margin (1952)
The Narrow Path: (1918 & 2006)
The Narrow Road: (1912 & 2022)
The Narrow Street (1925)
The Narrow Trail (1917)
The Narrow Valley (1921)
The Narrowing Circle (1956)
The Narrows (2008)
Narsi Bhagat (1940)
Narsimha (1991)
Narsinh Mehta (1932)
Nartaki: (1940 & 1963)
Nartanasala: (1963 & 2018)
Narthagi (2011)
Naruda Donoruda (2016)
Naruto series:
Naruto the Movie: Ninja Clash in the Land of Snow (2004)
Naruto the Movie: Legend of the Stone of Gelel (2005)
Naruto the Movie: Guardians of the Crescent Moon Kingdom (2006)
Naruto Shippuden the Movie (2007)
Naruto Shippuden the Movie: Bonds (2008)
Naruto Shippuden the Movie: The Will of Fire (2009)
Naruto Shippuden the Movie: The Lost Tower (2010)
Naruto the Movie: Blood Prison (2011)
Road to Ninja: Naruto the Movie (2012)
The Last: Naruto the Movie (2014)
Boruto: Naruto the Movie (2015)

Nas

Nas: Time Is Illmatic (2014)
Nasaan si Francis? (2006)
Nasaan Ka Man (2005)
Nasbandi (1978)
Naseeb: (1981 & 1997)
Naseeb Apna Apna: (1970 & 1986)
Naseem (1995)
Nasha (2013)
Nashebaaz (2016)
Nashibvaan (2019)
Nashville (1975)
Nashville Girl (1976)
Nashville Rebel (1966)
Nashville Rises (2011)
Nasi Lemak 2.0 (2011)
Nasib Si Labu Labi (1963)
Nasrani (2007)
Nasser 56 (1996)
Nastasja (1994)
Nastik: (1954 & 1983)
Nasty Baby (2015)
Nasty Boys (1989 TV)
Nasty Burgers (1993)
The Nasty Girl (1990)
Nasty Habits (1977)
Nasty Love (1995)
Nasty Old People (2009)
Nasty Quacks (1945)
The Nasty Rabbit (1964)
Nasu: Summer in Andalusia (2003)

Nat

Nat Khat Mhar Tae Tite Pwal (2015)
Nat Phat Tae Sone Twal Myar (2010)
Nat Pinkerton in the Fight (1920)
Nat Turner: A Troublesome Property (2003)
Nata Sarvabhouma (1968)
Natacha Atlas, la rose pop du Caire (2007)
Natakala Rayudu (1969)
Natakam (2018)
Natale a Beverly Hills (2009)
Natale a Londra – Dio salvi la regina (2016)
Natale a Miami (2005)
Natale a New York (2006)
Natale sul Nilo (2002)
Natale a Rio (2008)
Natale a cinque stelle (2018)
Natale col Boss (2015)
Natale da chef (2017)
Natale in India (2003)
Natale in Sudafrica (2010)
Natale in crociera (2007)
Natalee Holloway (2009)
Natalia (1988)
Natalie (2010)
Natalie Wood: What Remains Behind (2020)
Natannethuwa Dinna (2016)
Natasaarvabhowma (2019)
Natasha: (1974, 2001 & 2015)
Natchathira Nayagan (1992)
Natchathiram (1980)
Natchathiram Nagargiradhu (2022)
Natchatra Kadhal (2001)
Natchez Trace (1960)
Nate and the Colonel (2003)
Nate and Hayes (1983)
Nate & Margaret (2012)
Nathalie... (2003)
Nathan the Wise (1922)
Nathayil Muthu (1973)
Nathi Bari Tarzan (2019)
Nathi Muthal Nathi Vare (1983)
Nathicharami (2018)
Natholi Oru Cheriya Meenalla (2013)
Nathoon (1974)
Nati (2014)
Nati stanchi (2002)
Nation Aflame (1937)
Nation and Destiny series (1992–2002)
Nation Estate (2013)
A Nation Is Built (1938)
Nation Under Siege (2013)
National Anthem (2003)
The National Anthem (1999)
The National Barn Dance (1944)
National Bird (2016)
National Bomb (2004)
National Champions (2021)
National Customs (1935)
The National Health (1973) 
National Lampoon series:
National Lampoon Presents Dorm Daze (2003)
National Lampoon: Drunk Stoned Brilliant Dead (2015)
National Lampoon's Adam & Eve (2005)
National Lampoon's Animal House (1978)
National Lampoon's Bag Boy (2007)
National Lampoon's Barely Legal (2003)
National Lampoon's Christmas Vacation (1989)
National Lampoon's Christmas Vacation 2: Cousin Eddie's Island Adventure (2003) (TV)
National Lampoon's Class Reunion (1982)
National Lampoon's Dorm Daze 2 (2006)
National Lampoon's European Vacation (1985)
National Lampoon's Gold Diggers (2003)
National Lampoon's Golf Punks (1998)
National Lampoon's Last Resort (1994)
National Lampoon's Loaded Weapon 1 (1993)
National Lampoon's Movie Madness (1982)
National Lampoon's Pledge This! (2006)
National Lampoon's Pucked (2006)
National Lampoon's Senior Trip (1995)
National Lampoon's Thanksgiving Family Reunion (2003)
National Lampoon's TV: The Movie (2006)
National Lampoon's Vacation (1983)
National Lampoon's Van Wilder (2002)
National Lampoon's Van Wilder: The Rise of Taj (2006)
National Lampoon's Van Wilder: Freshman Year (2009)
Vegas Vacation (1997)
National Mechanics (1972)
National Security: (2003 & 2012)
National Treasure series:
National Treasure (2004)
National Treasure: Book of Secrets (2007)
The National Tree (2009)
National Velvet (1944)
Natir Puja (1932)
Native (2016)
Native Land (1942)
Native New Yorker (2006)
Native Son: (1951, 1986, 2010 & 2019)
Nativity series:
Nativity! (2009)
Nativity 2: Danger in the Manger (2012)
Nativity 3: Dude, Where's My Donkey? (2014)
Nativity Rocks! (2018)
The Nativity (1978 TV)
The Nativity Story (2006)
Natpadhigaram 79 (2016)
Natpe Thunai (2019)
Natpu (1986)
Natpukkaga (1998)
Natpuna Ennanu Theriyuma (2019)
Natsamrat: (2016 & 2018)
Natsume's Book of Friends: The Waking Rock and the Strange Visitor (2021)
Natsume's Book of Friends the Movie: Tied to the Temporal World (2018)
Nattamai (1994)
Nattbuss 807 (1997)
Nattuchakkeruttu (1980)
Nattukku Oru Nallavan (1991)
Nattupura Nayagan (1997)
Nattupura Pattu (1996)
Natturajavu (2004)
Natura contro (1988)
The Natural (1984)
A Natural Born Gambler (1916)
Natural Born Killers (1994)
Natural Born Pranksters (2016)
Natural Causes: (1985 & 1994)
Natural City (2003)
Natural Enemies (1979)
The Natural History of Parking Lots (1990)
Natural Justice: Heat (1996 TV)
Natural Light (2021)
A Natural Man (1915)
Natural Selection: (2011 & 2016)
 Naturally Native (1998)
Naturally Obsessed (2009)
Nature of the Beast (2007)
The Nature of the Beast: (1919 & 1995)
Nature Calls (2012)
Nature Law (2014)
Nature Unleashed: Earthquake (2005)
Nature's Gentleman (1918)
 Nature’s Grave (2008)
Nature's Half Acre (1951)
Nature's Touch (1914)
Natutulog Pa Ang Diyos (1988)
Natyam (2021)
Natyarani (1949)

Nau

Nau Do Gyarah (1957)
Naug Ma Kja Kyay (2004)
Naughty 40 (2017)
Naughty @ 40 (2011)
Naughty Baby (1928)
Naughty Boy (1962)
Naughty Boys & Soldiers (1996)
Naughty but Nice (1927)
Naughty Cinderella (1933)
Naughty Dallas (1964)
The Naughty Duchess (1928)
The Naughty Flirt (1931)
Naughty Girl (1956)
Naughty Grandma (2017)
Naughty Jatts (2013)
The Naughty List (2016)
Naughty Marietta (1935)
Naughty Martine (1947)
Naughty but Mice (1939)
Naughty Nanette (1927)
Naughty, Naughty (1974)
Naughty, Naughty! (1918)
Naughty Neighbors (1939)
Naughty but Nice (1939)
Naughty or Nice (2014)
The Naughty Nineties (1945)
The Naughty Otter (1916)
Naughty Professor (2012)
Naujawan (1951)
Naukar (1943)
Naukar Biwi Ka (1983)
Naukar Ki Kameez (1999)
Naukar Wohti Da (1974)
Nauker (1979)
Naulakha Haar (1953)
Nausicaä of the Valley of the Wind (1984)
Nautanki Saala! (2013)

Nav

Nava Vasantham (2007)
Navagatharkku Swagatham (2012)
Navagraha (2008)
Navagraha Nayagi (1985)
Navagraham (1970)
Navajeevana (1964)
Navajeevanam (1949)
Navajeros (1980)
Navajo (1952)
Navajo Blues (1996)
Navajo Joe (1966)
Navajo Kid (1945)
Navajo Run (1964)
Navajo Trail Raiders (1949)
The Navajo's Bride (1910)
The Naval Commandos (1977)
Navalny (2022)
Navarasa (2005)
The Navigator (1924)
The Navigator: A Medieval Odyssey (1988)
The Navigators (2001)
The Navy (1930)
The Navy Aviator (1914)
Navy Blue Days (1925)
Navy Blue and Gold (1937)
Navy Blues: (1929, 1937 & 1941)
The Navy Comes Through (1942)
The Navy Lark (1959)
The Navy vs. the Night Monsters (1966)
Navy Nurse (1945)
Navy SEALs (1990)
Navy Seals vs. Zombies (2015)
Navy Secrets (1939)
Navy Spy (1937)
The Navy Way (1944)
Navy Wife: (1935 & 1956)

Naw–Nay

Nawab Naarkali (1972)
Nawab Sirajuddaula (1967)
Naxal (2015)
The Naxalites (1980)
Naya Andaz (1956)
Naya Daur: (1957 & 1978)
Naya Din Nai Raat (1974)
Naya Kadam (1984)
Naya Kanoon (1965)
Naya Khoon (1990)
Naya Legend of the Golden Dolphin (2022)
Naya Legend of the Golden Dolphins (2010)
Naya Nasha (1973)
Naya Pata (2014)
Naya Raasta (1970)
Naya Safar (1982)
Naya Sansar (1941)
Naya Tarana (1943)
Naya Zaher (1991)
Naya Zamana (1971)
Nayagan (2008)
Nayak: (1966, 2001 Assamese & 2001 Hindi)
Nayakan: (1985, 1987 & 2010)
Nayakudu Vinayakudu (1980)
Nayaki (2016)
Nayam Vyakthamakkunnu (1991)
Nayee Padosan (2003)
Nayyapudai (2016)

Naz

Naz & Maalik (2015)
Nazar: (1991 & 2005)
Nazar the Brave (1940)
Nazar Ke Samne (1995)
Nazareno Cruz and the Wolf (1975)
Nazarín (1968)
Nazhikakkallu (1970)
Nazi Agent (1942)
Nazi Hunter: The Beate Klarsfeld Story (1986 TV)
Nazi Love Camp 27 (1977)
The Nazi Plan (1945)
Nazi Pop Twins (2007)
Nazis at the Center of the Earth (2012)
The Nazis Strike (1943)
Nazis: The Occult Conspiracy (1998)
Nazrana: (1942, 1961 & 1987)
That Nazty Nuisance (1943)

Nd

Ndeyssaan (2001)
Ndoto Za Elibidi (2010)

Ne

Ne čakaj na maj (1957)
Ne daj se, Floki (1986)
The Ne'er-Do-Well: (1916 & 1923)
Ne jouez pas avec les Martiens (1967)
Ne m'abandonne pas (2016 TV)
Ne parliamo Lunedi (1990)
Ne quittez pas ! (2004)
Ne Zha (2019)

Nea–Neb

Neal of the Navy (1915)
Neal 'n' Nikki (2005)
The Neanderthal Man (1953)
Neang Champameas (1970)
Neapolitan Carousel (1954)
Neapolitan Mouse (1954)
Neapolitan Mystery (1979)
A Neapolitan Spell (2002)
Neapolitan Turk (1953)
Neapolitans in Milan (1953)
Near Dark (1987)
Near Death Experience (2014)
Near Dublin (1924)
Near to Earth (1913)
Near and Far Away (1976)
The Near Future (2012)
Near the Rainbow's End (1930)
Near the Trail's End (1931)
Nearer My God to Thee (1917)
Nearest and Dearest (1972)
Nearest to Heaven (2002)
Nearing Grace (2005)
The Nearly Complete and Utter History of Everything (1999 TV)
A Nearly Decent Girl (1963)
Nearly a Deserter (1916)
Nearly Eighteen (1943)
Nearly a King (1916)
Nearly a Lady (1915)
Nearly Married (1917)
Nearly a Nasty Accident (1961)
The Nearsighted School Teacher (1898)
Neberte nám princeznú (1981)
Nebeski odred (1961)
Nebeští jezdci (1968)
Nebo Zovyot (1959)
Nebraska (2013)
The Nebraskan (1953)

Nec-Ned

Necessary Evil (2008)
The Necessary Evil (1925)
Necessary Evil: Super-Villains of DC Comics (2013)
Necessary Love (1991)
Necessary Roughness (1991)
The Necessities of Life (2008)
Neck (2010)
Neck and Neck (1931)
A Necklace for My Beloved (1971)
The Necktie (2008)
Necrofobia (2014)
Necromancer: (1988 & 2005)
Necromancy (1972)
Necromentia (2009)
Necronomicon (1993)
Necropolis (1970)
Necropolis Awakened (2002)
Necropolis, They Will Be Ashes But Still Will Feel (2016)
Necrosis (2009)
Ned (2003)
Ned Blessing: The True Story of My Life (1992 TV)
Ned Kelly: (1970 & 2003)
Ned McCobb's Daughter (1928)
Ned Rifle (2014)
Nederland en Oranje (1913)
Neds (2010)
Ned's Project (2016)
Nedunalvaadai (2019)
Nedunchaalai (2014)

Nee

Nee! (1965)
Nee Bareda Kadambari (1985)
Nee Enthan Vaanam (2000)
Nee Illadhe (2011)
Nee Jathaga Nenundali (2014)
Nee Ko Njaa Cha (2013)
Nee Kosam (1999)
Nee Manasu Naaku Telusu (2003)
Nee-Na (2015)
Nee Naan Nila (2007)
Nee Nanna Gellalare (1981)
Nee Pathi Naan Pathi (1991)
Nee Premakai (2002)
Nee Sneham (2002)
Nee Sukhame Ne Koruthunna (2008)
Nee Tata Naa Birla (2008)
Nee Thanda Kanike (1985)
Nee Thodu Kavali (2002)
Nee Unnai Arindhaal (2009)
Nee Varuvai Ena (1999)
Nee Varuvolam (1997)
Nee Venunda Chellam (2006)
Neecha Nagar (1946)
Need for Speed (2014)
Needful Things (1993)
Needhi (1972)
Needhi Pizhaithathu (1981)
Needhi Singh (2016)
Needhikku Thalaivanangu (1976)
Needhikkuppin Paasam (1963)
Needhipathi (1955)
Needhiyin Nizhal (1985)
Needi Naadi Oke Katha (2018)
Needing You... (2000)
Needle (2010)
The Needle (1988) 
Needle in the Haystack (1953)
Needle in a Timestack (2021)
Neeku Naaku Dash Dash (2012)
Neeku Nenu Naaku Nuvvu (2003)
Neel Akasher Chandni (2009)
Neel Akasher Neechey (1958)
Neel Kamal: (1947 & 1968)
Neel Rajar Deshe (2008)
Neela (2001)
Neela Aakash (1965)
Neela Kurinji Poothappol (1987)
Neela Kuyil (1995)
Neela Malargal (1979)
Neela Parbat (1969)
Neela Ponman (1975)
Neela Sari (1976)
Neela Vaanam (1965)
Neelagiri (1991)
Neelagiri Express (1968)
Neelakannukal (1974)
Neelakanta (2006)
Neelakasham Pachakadal Chuvanna Bhoomi (2013)
Neelakuyil (1954)
Neelam (2013)
Neelamalai Thirudan (1957)
Neelathamara: (1979 & 2009)
Neelavukku Neranja Manasu (1958)
Neeli (2018)
Neelkanth (2012)
Neelmani (1957)
Neem Annapurna (1979)
Neenade Naa (2014)
Neend Hamari Khwab Tumhare: (1966 & 1971)
Neenello Naanalle (2006)
Neenga Nalla Irukkanum (1992)
Neengadha Ninaivu (1963)
Neengal Kettavai (1984)
Neenu Nakkare Haalu Sakkare (1991)
Neer Dose (2016)
Neeraba Jhada (1984)
Neerali (2018)
Neerja (2016)
Neerkumizhi (1965)
Neermaathalathinte pookkal (2006 TV)
Neerparavai (2012)
Neerum Neruppum (1971)
Neethaane En Ponvasantham (2012)
Neethi (1971)
Neethi Devan Mayakkam (1982)
Neethibathi (1983)
Neethikku Thandanai (1987)
Neethipeedam (1977)
Neethiyin Marupakkam (1985)
Neetho (2002)
Neeti-Nijayiti (1972)
Neevevaro (2018)
Neeya? (1979)
Neeya 2 (2019)
Neeyallengil Njan (1987)
Neeyat (1980)
Neeye Nijam (2005)
Neeyethra Dhanya (1987)
Neeyo Njaano (1979)
Neeyum Naanum (2010)
Neeyum Njanum (2019)

Nef–Nek

Nefarious: Merchant of Souls (2011)
Nefertiti, figlia del sole (1994)
Nefertiti, Queen of the Nile (1961)
Negadon: The Monster from Mars (2005)
Negar (2017)
Negative Space (2017)
Negatives: (1968 & 1988)
The Neglected Wife (1917)
The Negotiation (2018)
The Negotiator (1998)
The Negro (2002)
Negro Colleges in War Time (1943)
Negro es mi color (1951)
The Negro Sailor (1945)
The Negro Soldier (1944)
Negroes with Guns: Rob Williams and Black Power (2004)
Nehle Pe Dehla (1976)
Nehlle Pe Dehlla (2007)
Neige (1981)
Neighbor (2009)
The Neighbor: (1993, 2012 & 2018)
The Neighbor No. Thirteen (2005)
The Neighbor's Wife and Mine (1931)
Neighborhood House (1936)
The Neighborhood Watch (2014)
Neighboring Sounds (2012)
Neighbors: (1920, 1981 & 2014)
Neighbors 2: Sorority Rising (2016)
Neighbours: (1952 & 1966)
Neighbours: They Are Vampires (2014)
Neil Gaiman: Dream Dangerously (2013)
Neil Simon's I Ought to Be in Pictures (1982)
Neil Young: Heart of Gold (2006)
Neil Young Journeys (2011)
Neil Young Trunk Show (2009)
Neil's Party (2005)
Neither Are We Enemies (1970 TV)
Neither Blood nor Sand (1941)
Neither by Day nor by Night (1972)
Neither at Home or Abroad (1919)
Neither Rich nor Poor (1953)
Neither Seen Nor Recognized (1958)
Nejlepší člověk (1954)
Nejlepší ženská mého života (1968)
Největší z Čechů (2010)
Nekabborer Mohaproyan (2014)
Nekro (1997)
Nekromancer (2018)
NEKRomantik series:
NEKRomantik (1987)
NEKRomantik 2 (1991)

Nel–Nem

Nel blu dipinto di blu (1959)
Nel sole (1967)
Nela (2018)
Nelavanka (1983)
Nell (1994)
Nell Gwyn (1926)
Nell Gwynn (1934)
Nella città l'inferno (1959)
Nellie, the Beautiful Cloak Model (1924)
Nelligan (1991)
Nell's Eugenic Wedding (1914)
Nellu: (1974 & 2010)
Nelly: (2004 & 2016)
Nelly, the Bride Without a Husband (1924)
Nelly and Mr. Arnaud (1995)
Nelly's Folly (1961)
Nelly's Version (1983)
Nelson: (1918 & 1926)
The Nelson Affair (1973)
Nema aviona za Zagreb (2012)
Nema problema: (1984 & 2004)
Nemesis: (1920, 1992 & 2010)
Nemesis 2: Nebula (1995)
Nemesis 3: Prey Harder (1996)
Nemesis 4: Death Angel (1996)
Nemesis Game (2003)
Nemir (1982)
Nemo's Bank (1934)
Nemoda Boolya (2017)
Nemtsov (2016)
Nemuranai Machi: Shinjuku Same (1993)
Nemuri Kyōshirō manji giri (1969)
Nemuri no Mori (2014 TV)
Nemuritorii (1974)

Nen–Nep

Nena (2014)
Nenante Nene (1968)
Nenapina Doni (1986)
Nenapirali (2005)
Nenè (1977)
Nene Monaganni (1968)
Nene Raju Nene Mantri (2017)
Nenem...Chinna Pillana? (2013)
Neneh Superstar (2022)
Neninthe (2008)
Nenjai Thodu (2007)
Nenjam Marappathillai: (1963 & 2021)
Nenjamundu Nermaiyundu Odu Raja (2019)
Nenjangal (1982)
Nenjathai Allitha (1984)
Nenjathai Killadhe (2008)
Nenjathai Killathe (1980)
Nenjil Jil Jil (2006)
Nenjil Or Aalayam (1962)
Nenjil Thunivirundhal (2017)
Nenjile Thunivirunthal (1981)
Nenjinile (1999)
Nenjirukkum Varai: (1967 & 2006)
Nentaro Gantu Kallaro (1979)
Nenu Local (2017)
Nenu Meeku Telusa...? (2009)
Nenu Naa Rakshasi (2011)
Nenu Premisthunnanu (1998)
Nenu Sailaja (2016)
Nenunnanu (2004)
Neo Ned (2005)
Neo Rauch – Gefährten und Begleiter (2016)
Neo Tokyo (1987)
The Neon Bible (1995)
Neon Bull (2015)
The Neon Ceiling (1971 TV)
Neon City (1991)
The Neon Demon (2016)
The Neon Empire (1989 TV)
Neon Maniacs (1986)
Nepal Forever (2013)
Nepali (2008)
The Nephew (1998)
The Nephews of Zorro (1968)
Neptune Bewitched (1925)
The Neptune Factor (1973)
Neptune Frost (2021)
Neptune Mission (1958)
Neptune's Daughter: (1914 & 1949)

Ner

Neram Nadi Kadu Akalidi (1976)
Neram Pularumbol (1986)
Neram Vandhachu (1982)
Neramu Siksha (1973)
Neranja Manasu (2004)
Nerariyan CBI (2005)
Nerariyum Nerathu (1985)
Nerd Prom: Inside Washington's Wildest Week (2015)
Nerd Wars! (2011)
Nerdcore for Life (2008)
Nerdcore Rising (2008)
Nerdland (2016)
Neria (1993)
Nerkonda Paarvai (2019)
Nero: (1909, 1922 & 2004)
Nero and the Burning of Rome (1953)
Nero Wolfe (1977 TV)
Nerone: (1930 & 1977)
Nerrukku Ner (1997)
Nertsery Rhymes (1933)
Neruda (2016)
Nerungi Vaa Muthamidathe (2014)
Neruppu Da (2017)
Nerupukkul Eeram (1984)
Nerve: (2013 & 2016)
Nerves (1919)
Nervous Night (1986)
Nervy Nat Kisses the Bride (1904)

Nes–Neu

Nesam Pudhusu (1999)
Neshoba (2010)
Nesimi (1973)
Nessie & Me (2017)
Nessun Dorma (2016)
Nessuno è perfetto (1981)
Nessuno ha tradito (1952)
Nessuno mi può giudicare (1966) 
The Nest: (1927, 1980, 1988, 2002, 2018 & 2020)
The Nest of the Turtledove (2016)
A Nest Unfeathered (1914)
Nest of Wasps (1927)
The Nesting (1981)
Nešto između (1983)
The Net: (1923, 1953, 1975, 1995 & 2016)
The Net 2.0 (2006)
Net Worth: (1995 & 2000)
Netaji (2019)
Netaji Palkar (1927)
NetForce (1999)
Netherbeast Incorporated (2007)
Netherland Dwarf (2008)
Netherworld (1991)
Nethraa (2019)
Neti Bharatam (1983)
Neti Siddhartha (1990)
Netrikkan (1981)
Netru Indru Naalai: (1974 & 2008)
Nets of Destiny (1924)
Nettippattam (1991)
Netto (2005)
Network: (1976 & 2019)
Netz über Bord – Heringsfang auf der Nordsee (1955)
Netzwerk (1970)
Neuilly sa mère, sa mère! (2018)
Neuilly Yo Mama! (2009)
Neurons to Nirvana (2013)
Neurosia: 50 Years of Perversity (1995)
Neurotypical (2013)
Neutral Port (1940)
Neutrality (1949)

Nev

Nevada: (1927, 1935, 1944 & 1997)
Nevada Badmen (1951)
The Nevada Buckaroo (1931)
Nevada City (1941)
Nevada Smith: (1966 & 1975 TV)
The Nevadan (1950)
Never (2014)
Never Again: (1916 & 2001)
Never Back Down series:
Never Back Down (2008)
Never Back Down 2: The Beatdown (2011)
Never Back Down: No Surrender (2016)
Never Back Losers (1961)
Never a Backward Step (1966)
Never Been Kissed (1999)
Never Been Thawed (2005)
Never Cry Werewolf (2008)
Never Cry Wolf (1983)
Never Die Alone (2004)
Never Die Young (2013)
Never a Dull Moment: (1943, 1950 & 1968)
Never Ending Story (2012)
Never Ever: (1996 & 2016)
Never Fear (1950)
Never on the First Night (2014)
Never Forever (2007)
Never Forget (1991 TV)
Never Forget Me (1976)
Never Give a Sucker an Even Break (1941)
Never Give Up (1978)
Never Give Up: The 20th Century Odyssey of Herbert Zipper (1995)
Never Goin' Back (2018)
Never Gone (2016)
Never Gonna Snow Again (2020)
Never Grow Old (2019)
 Never Have I Ever (2009)
Never Here (2017)
Never Leave Me (2017)
Never Let Go (1960)
Never Let Me Go: (1953 & 2010)
Never Look Away (2018)
Never Look Back (1952)
Never Love a Stranger (1958)
Never Met Picasso (1996)
Never Mind the Quality Feel the Width (1973)
Never My Soul! (2001)
Never Never Land (1980)
Never Not Love You (2018)
Never Put It in Writing (1964)
Never Quite the Same (2008)
Never Rarely Sometimes Always (2020)
Never Said Goodbye (2016)
Never Say Die: (1939, 1988 & 2017) 
Never Say Goodbye: (1946 & 1956)
Never Say Never Again (1983)
Never Say Never Mind: The Swedish Bikini Team (2001)
Never Say Quit (1919)
Never Sleep Again: The Elm Street Legacy (2010)
Never So Few (1959)
Never Steady, Never Still (2017)
Never Steal Anything Small (1959)
Never Stop (2021)
Never on Sunday (1960)
Never Surrender (2009)
Never Take No for an Answer (1951)
Never Take Sweets from a Stranger (1960)
Never Talk to Strangers (1995)
Never Too Late: (1935, 1965 & 1996)
Never Too Old (1914)
Never Touched Me (1919)
Never Trouble Trouble (1931)
Never Trust a Gambler (1951)
Never Trust a Woman (1930)
Never on Tuesday (1989)
Never the Twain (1926)
Never the Twain Shall Meet: (1925 & 1931)
Never Wave at a WAC (1953)
Never Weaken (1921)
The Neverending Story series:
The Neverending Story (1984)
The NeverEnding Story II: The Next Chapter (1990)
The NeverEnding Story III (1994)
Neverlake (2013)
Neverland (2003)
Nevermore: (2006 & 2007)
Neverwas (2005)
Nevidni bataljon (1967)
Nevíte o bytě? (1947)

New

New (2004)
The New Adventures of Aladdin (2015)
The New Adventures of Cinderella (2017)
The New Adventures of the Elusive Avengers (1968)
New Adventures of Get Rich Quick Wallingford (1931)
The New Adventures of Heidi (1978 TV)
The New Adventures of J. Rufus Wallingford (1915)
The New Adventures of Little Toot (1992)
The New Adventures of Pinocchio (1999)
The New Adventures of Pippi Longstocking (1988)
The New Adventures of Snow White (1969)
The New Adventures of Spin and Marty: Suspect Behavior (2000 TV)
New Adventures of a Yankee in King Arthur's Court (1988)
The New Age (1994)
The New Babylon (1929)
The New Barbarians (1983)
The New Bell (1950)
New Best Friend (2002)
The New Bremen Town Musicians (2000)
The New Centurions (1972)
The New China (1950)
The New Clown (1916)
The New Commandment (1925)
The New Corporation: The Unfortunately Necessary Sequel (2020)
The New Country (2000)
A New Cure for Divorce (1912)
The New Daughter (2009)
A New Day in Old Sana'a (2005)
The New Deal Show (1937)
New Dragon Gate Inn (1992)
The New Dress (1911)
New Frontier (1939)
The New Frontier (1935)
The New Gentlemen (1929)
The New Girlfriend (2014)
The New Gladiators (2002)
The New Godfathers (1979)
New Gods: Nezha Reborn (2021)
The New Gulliver (1935)
The New Guy (2002)
New Happy Dad and Son 2: The Instant Genius (2016)
The New Hotel (1932)
The New Interns (1964)
New Jack City (1991)
The New Janitor (1914)
New Jersey Drive (1995)
The New Kids (1985)
A New Kind of Love (1963)
The New King of Comedy (2019)
The New Klondike (1926)
The New Land: (1924 & 1972)
A New Leaf (1971)
The New Legend of Shaolin (1994)
A New Life (1988)
The New Life of Paul Sneijder (2016)
The New Lot (1943)
A New Love Ishtory (2013)
The New Man (2007)
The New Maverick (1978 TV)
New Moon: (1930 & 1940)
The New Moon (1919)
The New Moscow (1938)
The New Mutants (2020)
The New One-Armed Swordsman (1971)
The New Paradise (1921)
New Pillow Fight (1897)
New Police Story (2004)
The New Pupil (1940)
The New Radical (2017)
The New Relative (1934)
The New Romantic (2018)
New Rose Hotel (1998)
The New Spirit (1942)
The New Superintendent (1911)
The New Swiss Family Robinson (1998 TV) 
The New Teacher (1939)
The New Ten Commandments (2008)
The New Tenants (2009)
New in Town (2009)
New Waterford Girl (1999)
A New Wave (2006)
New Women (1935)
The New World: (1957, 2005 & 2011)
New World Order (2009)
 New World Order: The End Has Come (2013)
New Year: (1924 & 1989)
The New Year (2010)
New Year Blues (2021)
The New Year Parade (2008)
New Year's Day: (1989 & 2001)
New Year's Eve: (1924, 1929, 2002 & 2011)
The New Year's Eve of Old Lee (2016)
New Year's Evil (1980)
New York Doll (2005)
The New York Hat (1912)
The New York Idea (1920)
New York Minute (2004)
New York New York (2016)
New York Ninja (2021)
The New York Peacock (1917)
The New York Ripper (1982)
New York Stories (1989)
New York, I Love You (2009)
New York, New York (1977)
Newark Athlete (1891)
The Newburgh Sting (2014)
 The Newcomers (2020)
The Newer Way (1915)
The Newest Pledge (2012)
The Newest Star of Variety (1917)
The Newman Shame (1977 TV)
 Newness (2017)
The News (1989)
News Is Made at Night (1939)
The News Parade of the Year 1942 (1942)
News of the World (2020)
A Newsboy Hero (1911)
Newsfront (1978)
The Newsie and the Lady (1938)
Newsies (1992)
A Newspaper Nemesis (1915)
The Newspaperman (2017)
Newton (2017)
The Newton Boys (1998)

Nex–Nez

Next: (1990 & 2007)
Next: A Primer on Urban Painting (2005)
Next Aisle Over (1919)
The Next Best Thing (2000)
The Next Big Thing (2001)
The Next Corner (1924)
Next Day Air (2009)
Next Door: (1975 & 1994)
Next Enti? (2018)
Next Floor (2008)
Next Friday (2000)
Next Gen (2018)
Next Goal Wins: (2014 & 2023)
Next to Her (2014)
The Next Karate Kid (1994)
The Next of Kin (1942)
Next of Kin: (1982, 1984 & 1989)
The Next Man (1976)
Next to Me (2015)
Next to No Time (1958)
Next Nuvve (2017)
The Next One (1984)
Next, Please! (1930)
The Next Race: The Remote Viewings (2007)
Next Stop, Greenwich Village (1976)
Next Stop Paradise: (1980 & 1998)
Next Stop Wonderland (1998)
Next Summer (1985)
The Next Three Days (2010)
Next Time the Fire (1993)
Next Time I Marry (1938)
Next Time I'll Aim for the Heart (2014)
Next Time Ned (2008)
Next Time We Love (1936)
The Next Voice You Hear... (1950)
Next Year in Argentina (2005)
 Nextdoor to the Velinskys (2011)
Neydhen Vakivaakah (2017)
Neyngi Yaaru Vakivee (2016)
Neythukaran (2002)
Nezha (2014)
Nezlobte dědečka (1934)
Nezulla the Rat Monster (2002)

Ng–Nh

Nga mesi i errësirës (1978) 
Ngayong Nandito Ka (2003)
Ngwe Pay Lo Ma Ya (1932)
Nhamo (2011)

Ni

Ni Jing: Thou Shalt Not Steal (2013)
Ni na nebu ni na zemlji (1994)
Ni Noma (2016)

Nia–Nie

Niagara (1953)
Niagara Falls: (1932 & 1941)
Niagara Fools (1956)
Niagara: Miracles, Myths and Magic (1986)
Niagara Motel (2006)
Niagara, Niagara (1997)
Nibbles (2003)
Nice Bombs (2006)
Nice Dreams (1981)
Nice Girl? (1941)
A Nice Girl Like Me (1969)
A Nice Girl Like You (2020)
Nice Girls Don't Explode (1987)
Nice Guy Johnny (2010)
The Nice Guys (2016)
Nice Guys Sleep Alone (1999)
A Nice Little Bank That Should Be Robbed (1958)
A Nice Neighbor (1979)
Nice Package (2013)
Nice People (1922)
Nice Shootin' Cowboy (2008)
Nice Time (1957)
Nice View (2022)
Nice Witch (2018)
Nice Women (1931)
Nichaya Thaamboolam (1962)
Nichiren to Mōko Daishūrai (1958)
Nichiyobi wa Owaranai (2000)
Nicholas and Alexandra (1971)
Nicholas' Gift (1998)
Nicholas Nickleby: (1912 & 2002)
Nick Carter, Master Detective (1939)
Nick Fury: Agent of S.H.I.E.L.D. (1998 TV)
Nick, King of the Chauffeurs (1925)
Nick Nolte: No Exit (2008)
Nick & Norah's Infinite Playlist  (2008)
Nick Offerman: American Ham (2014)
Nick of Time (1995)
The Nickel-Hopper (1926)
Nickel Mountain (1984)
Nickel Queen (1971)
The Nickel Ride (1974)
Nickelodeon (1976)
Nicky's Game (2005)
Nico the Unicorn (1998)
Nicole (1978)
Nidhiyude Katha (1986)
Nidi Yahana Kelabei (2011)
Nidra: (1981 & 2012)
Nie Er (1959)
Niel Lynne (1985)
Niespotykanie spokojny człowiek (1975 TV)

Nif–Nih

The Nifty Nineties (1941)
Nigakute Amai (2016)
A Nigger in the Woodpile (1904)
Night: (1930 & 2008)
The Night: (1992 & 2020)
The Night of the 12th (2022)
Night Accident: (1980 & 2017)
Night Across the Street (2012)
Night of Adventure (2014)
A Night of Adventure (1944)
Night After Night (1932)
Night Alarm (1934)
Night Alone (1938)
The Night Angel (1931)
Night Angels (1987)
Night Arrival (1949)
Night Beat: (1931 & 1947)
The Night Before: (1988 & 2015)
The Night Before Christmas: (1905, 1913, 1933, 1941, 1951 & 1961)
The Night Before the Divorce (1942)
The Night Before the Premiere (1959)
The Night Belongs to Us (1929)
Night of the Big Heat (1967)
The Night Bird (1928)
Night Birds (1930)
Night of the Blood Beast (1958)
Night of the Bloody Apes (1972)
Night of Bloody Horror (1969)
Night Boat to Dublin (1946)
Night Boats (2012)
The Night Brings Charlie (1990)
Night of the Burglar (1921)
Night Bus: (2007 & 2017)
The Night Bus (2007)
Night Call Nurses (1972)
The Night Caller (1998)
Night Caller from Outer Space (1965)
A Night in Casablanca (1946)
Night Catches Us (2010)
Night and the City: (1950 & 1992)
Night in the City (1933)
The Night Clerk (2020)
Night Club: (1952 & 2011)
The Night Club (1925)
Night Club Girl (1945)
The Night Club Lady (1932)
The Night Club Queen (1934)
Night Club Scandal (1937)
The Night Coachman (1928)
Night of the Cobra Woman (1972)
Night Comes On (2018)
Night Comes Too Soon (1948)
The Night Comes for Us (2018)
Night of the Comet (1984)
Night Convoy (1932)
Night Court (1932)
Night Creatures (1962)
Night of the Creeps (1986)
The Night Crew (2015)
Night Crossing (1982)
Night at the Crossroads (1932)
The Night Cry (1926)
Night of Dark Shadows (1971)
Night and Day: (1946, 1991 & 2008)
Night of the Day of the Dawn (1991)
Night of the Dead (2006)
Night in December (1940)
Night of Decision (1956)
Night of the Demon: (1957 & 1980)
Night of the Demons series:
Night of the Demons: (1988 & 2009)
Night of the Demons 2 (1994)
Night of the Demons 3 (1997)
The Night Digger (1971)
Night Drum (1958)
Night Duty (1974)
Night of the Eagle (1962)
Night on Earth (1991)
The Night Eats the World (2018)
Night Editor (1946)
The Night Evelyn Came Out of the Grave (1971)
Night Eyes series:
Night Eyes (1990)
Night Eyes 2 (1992)
Night Eyes 3 (1993)
Night Eyes 4: Fatal Passion (1996)
Night Fairy (1986)
The Night Falls (1952)
Night Falls on Manhattan (1996)
Night Fare (2015)
Night of Fear (1972)
Night Fire (1994)
Night Fishing (2011)
The Night Flier (1997)
Night Flight: (1933 & 2014)
Night Flight from Moscow (1973)
Night of the Flood (1996)
The Night Flyer (1928)
Night and Fog: (1956 & 2009)
Night and Fog in Japan (1960)
Night and Fog in Zona (2015)
The Night of the Following Day (1969)
Night of the Fox (1990)
Night Freight (1955)
Night Friend (1987)
Night Fright (1967)
A Night Full of Rain (1978)
Night on the Galactic Railroad (1985)
Night Gallery (1969) (TV)
Night Game (1989)
Night Games: (1966 & 1980)
A Night at the Garden (2017)
Night of the Garter (1933)
The Night of the Generals (1967)
Night of the Ghouls (1957)
The Night God Screamed (1971)
Night at the Golden Eagle (2001)
The Night of the Grizzly (1966)
The Night Has Eyes (1942)
Night Has Settled (2014)
Night Has a Thousand Eyes (1948)
The Night Hawk: (1924 & 1938)
A Night in Heaven (1983)
Night of the Hell Hamsters (2006)
Night of Henna (2005)
The Night House (2020)
Night Hunter: (1996 & 2018)
The Night of the Hunter (1955)
The Night of the Iguana (1964)
Night Inn (1947)
Night Is Day (2012)
Night Is Short, Walk On Girl (2017)
Night in Jinling (1985)
Night Journey (1987)
Night of the Juggler (1980)
Night Kaleidoscope (2017)
Night Key (1937)
Night Killer (1990)
Night of the Kings (2020)
A Night of Knowing Nothing (2021)
Night of the Lepus (1972)
Night Life (1989)
Night Life of the Gods (1935)
Night Life Hero (1992)
Night Life in Hollywood (1922)
Night Life of New York (1925)
Night Life in Reno (1931)
A Night Like This (1932)
The Night Listener (2006)
Night of the Living Bread (1990)
Night of the Living Dead: (1968 & 1990)
Night of the Living Dead 3D (2006)
Night of the Living Dead 3D: Re-Animation (2012)
Night of the Living Dead: Darkest Dawn (2015)
Night of the Living Dead: Resurrection (2012)
Night of the Living Deb (2015)
Night of the Living Dorks (2004)
Night Lodgers (2007)
Night in London (1967)
Night Magic (1985)
Night Mail: (1935, 1936 & 2014)
Night in Manhattan (1937)
Night Market Hero (2011)
Night in May (1934)
Night Mayor (2009)
Night of Miracles (1954)
Night Monster (1942)
Night into Morning (1951)
Night Moves: (1975 & 2013)
Night at the Museum series:
Night at the Museum (2006)
Night at the Museum: Battle of the Smithsonian (2009)
Night at the Museum: Secret of the Tomb (2014)
Night Must Fall: (1937 & 1964)
Night of Mystery: (1927 & 1937)
Night of the Naked Dead (2013)
Night in New Orleans (1942)
Night and No Morning (1921)
Night Nurse: (1931 & 1979)
Night Nurse Ingeborg (1958)
A Night at the Opera (1935)
Night of the Orangutan (1992)
Night Out (1989)
A Night Out: (1915 & 1961)
Night Over Chile (1977)
Night Owl (1993)
Night Owls: (1930 & 2015)
Night Parade (1929)
Night in Paradise: (1946 & 2020)
A Night in Paradise: (1919 & 1932)
Night Partners (1983)
Night Passage (1957)
Night Pastor (1998)
Night Patrol (1984)
Night Peacock (2016)
Night of the Pencils (1986)
Night People: (1954 & 2015)
Night Plane from Chungking (1943)
The Night Porter: (1930 & 1974)
Night of the Prowler (1962)
Night of the Quarter Moon (1959)
Night Raiders: (1952 & 2021)
Night Rehearsal (1983)
A Night to Remember: (1942 & 1958)
Night Ride: (1930 & 1937)
Night Ride Home (1999)
Night Riders (1981)
The Night Riders: (1916, 1920 & 1939)
Night Riders of Montana (1951)
Night Round (1949)
A Night at the Roxbury (1998)
Night of the Running Man (1995)
Night of the Scarecrow (1995)
Night School: (1956, 1981 & 2018)
Night Screams (1987)
Night of the Seagulls (1975)
Night by the Seashore (1981)
Night of the Sharks (1988)
Night Shift: (1982 & 2018)
Night Shifts (2020)
The Night of the Shooting Stars (1982)
A Night in the Show (1915)
Night Sights (2011)
Night Skies (2006)
Night Slaves (1970)
Night Song: (1948 & 2016)
Night Spot (1938)
Night Stage to Galveston (1952)
The Night Stalker: (1972, 1987 & 2016)
The Night Strangler (1973)
Night of the Strangler (1972)
Night Stream (2013)
Night Tales (2016)
The Night of Taneyamagahara (2006)
Night Taxi (1950)
Night Teeth (2021)
Night of Temptation (1932)
Night of Terror (1933)
A Night of Terror (1911)
Night Terrors (1993)
The Night That Panicked America (1975) (TV)
The Night They Killed Rasputin (1960)
The Night They Raided Minsky's (1968)
The Night They Saved Christmas (1984) (TV)
The Night They Took Miss Beautiful (1977) (TV)
Night Tide (1961)
Night Time in Nevada (1948)
Night Train: (1959, 1998, 1999, 2007 & 2009)
Night Train for Inverness (1960)
Night Train to Lisbon (2013)
Night Train to Memphis (1946)
Night Train to Milan (1962)
Night Train to Munich (1940)
Night Train to Murder (1985)
Night Train to Paris (1964)
Night Train to Terror (1985)
Night Train to Venice (1993)
Night Trap (1993)
Night of Truth (2004)
Night of the Twelve (1949)
Night of the Twisters (1996)
Night Unto Night (1949)
Night of Violence (1965)
Night Visions (1990)
Night Visitor (1989)
The Night Visitor (1971)
Night Waitress (1936)
Night Walk (2019)
The Night Walker (1964)
Night Warning (1946)
Night Was Our Friend (1951)
The Night Watch: (1925, 1926 & 2011)
Night Watch: (1928, 1973 & 2004)
The Night Watchman: (1938 & 2008)
 The Night We Called It a Day (2003)
Night of the Werewolf (1980)
The Night of the White Pants (2006)
Night of the Wild (2015)
Night Will Fall (2014)
Night Without Pity (1961)
Night Without Sleep (1952)
Night Without Stars (1951)
Night Work: (1930 & 1939)
Night World (1932)
The Night the World Exploded (1957)
Night of the Zombies (1981)
Night Zoo (1987)
Nightbeast (1982)
Nightbooks (2021)
Nightbreaker (1989)
Nightbreed (1990)
Nightclub Hostess (1940)
Nightclub School Hospital (2012)
The Nightcomers (1971)
Nightcrawler (2014)
Nightfall: (1956, 1988, 2000 & 2012)
Nightflyers (1987)
Nighthawks: (1978, 1981 & 2019)
The Nightingale: (1914, 1936, 1979, 2013, 2018 & 2022)
The Nightingale's Prayer (1959)
Nightjohn (1996)
Nightkill (1980)
Nightlight: (2003 & 2015)
Nightmare: (1942, 1956, 1964, 1981, 2000 & 2011)
Nightmare on the 13th Floor (1990)
Nightmare Alley: (1947 & 2021)
Nightmare in Badham County (1976)
Nightmare Beach (1988)
The Nightmare Before Christmas (1993)
Nightmare at Bittercreek (1988) (TV)
Nightmare in Blood (1978)
Nightmare Castle (1965)
Nightmare Cinema (2018)
Nightmare City (1983)
Nightmare in Chicago (1964) (TV)
Nightmare in the Daylight (1992)
Nightmare Detective (2006)
Nightmare Detective 2 (2008)
A Nightmare on Elm Street series:
A Nightmare on Elm Street (1984)
A Nightmare on Elm Street 2: Freddy's Revenge (1985)
A Nightmare on Elm Street 3: Dream Warriors (1987)
A Nightmare on Elm Street 4: The Dream Master (1988)
A Nightmare on Elm Street 5: The Dream Child (1989)
A Nightmare on Elm Street (2010)
Nightmare Factory (2011)
Nightmare Honeymoon (1974)
Nightmare Man (2006)
Nightmare at Noon (1987)
Nightmare Nurse (2016)
Nightmare Sisters (1988)
Nightmare in the Sun (1965)
Nightmare in Wax (1969)
Nightmare Weekend (1986)
Nightmares: (1980 & 1983)
Nightmares in the Makeup Chair (2018)
Nightmares in Red, White and Blue (2009)
 Nightmaster (1988)
A Night's Adventure (1923)
Nights in Andalusia (1938)
Nights of Cabiria (1957)
Nights and Days (1975)
Nights of Farewell (1965)
Nights of Fire (1937)
Nights on the Nile (1949)
Nights in Port Said (1932)
Nights on the Road (1952)
Nights in Rodanthe (2008)
Nights of Terror (1921)
Nights and Weekends (2008)
Nightshapes (1999)
Nightside (1980)
Nightstalker (2002)
Nightstick (1987)
Nightveil: Witch War (2005)
Nightwalking (2008)
Nightwatch: (1994 & 1997)
Nightwatching (2007)
Nightwatchman (2000)
Nightwing (1979)
Nightwish (1989)
Nightworld (2017)
The Nihilist (1905)
Nihon no Fixer (1979)

Nij–Nim

Nijangal Nilaikkindrana (1980)
Nijinsky (1980)
Nikaah (1982)
Nikah (1998)
Nikah Halala (1971)
Nikdo nic neví (1947)
Niki and Flo (2003)
Nikini Vassa (2013)
Nikita (1990)
Nikka Zaildar series:
Nikka Zaildar (2016)
Nikka Zaildar 2 (2017)
Nikki and the Perfect Stranger (2013)
Nikki, Wild Dog of the North (1961)
Nikodem Dyzma (1956)
Nikolai Vavilov (1990)
Nikolaikirche (1995 TV)
Nikos the Impaler (2003)
Nikto, krome nas... (2008)
Nikyho velebné dobrodružství (1920)
Nil Akasher Niche (1969)
Nil Battey Sannata (2015)
Nil Diya Yahana (2008)
Nil Gavani Kadhali (1969)
Nil Gavani Sellathey (2010)
Nil by Mouth (1997)
Nil Nirjane (2003)
Nila (1994)
Nila Kaalam (2001 TV)
Nila Pennae (1990)
Nilaave Vaa (1998)
Nilaavinte Naattil (1986)
Nilachaley Mahaprabhu (1957)
Nilacholey Kiriti (2018)
Nilalang (2015)
Nilam (1949)
Nilanjana (2017)
Nilave Malare (1986)
Nilave Mugam Kaattu (1999)
Nilavu (2010)
Nilavu Suduvathillai (1984)
The Nile Hilton Incident (2017)
Niloofar (2007)
Nim Him (2020)
Nim's Island (2008)
Nimbe (2019)
Nimed marmortahvlil (2002)
Nimirndhu Nil (2014)
Nimishangal (1986)
Nimki (2019)
Nimmo (1984)
Nimnayaka Hudekalawa (2017)
Nimona (2020)

Nin

Nina: (2004, 2016 & 2017)
Nina Forever (2015)
Nina Takes a Lover (1994)
Nina Wu (2019)
Nina, the Flower Girl (1917)
Nina's Heavenly Delights (2006)
Nina's House (2005)
Nina's Journey (2005)
Nina's Tragedies (2003)
Nine (2009)
The Nine Ages of Nakedness (1969)
Nine Days (2020)
Nine Days that Changed the World (2010)
Nine Dead (2009)
Nine to Five (1980)
Nine Forty-Five (1934)
Nine Girls (1944)
Nine Guests for a Crime (1977)
Nine Hours to Rama (1963)
Nine Legends (2016)
Nine from Little Rock (1964)
Nine Lives: (1957, 2002, 2005 & 2016)
Nine Lives Are Not Enough (1941)
The Nine Lives of Fritz the Cat (1974)
The Nine Lives of Marion Barry (2009)
The Nine Lives of Tomas Katz (2000)
Nine Men (1943)
Nine Miles Down (2009)
Nine Months (1995)
A Nine O'Clock Town (1918)
Nine Queens (2000)
The Nines (2007)
Ninja (2009)
Ninja Academy (1990)
Ninja Assassin (2009)
Ninja III: The Domination (1984)
Ninja Kids!!! (2011)
A Ninja Pays Half My Rent (2003)
Ninja Scroll (1993)
Ninja: Shadow of a Tear (2013)
Ninjas vs. Zombies (2008)
Ninnistham Ennishtam (1986)
Ninnishtam Ennishtam 2 (2011)
Ninotchka (1939)
The Ninth Configuration (1980)
The Ninth Day (2004)
The Ninth Gate (1999)
The Ninth Heart (1979)

Nio–Nir

Niobe (1915)
Nion in the Kabaret de La Vita (1986)
Nipped (1914)
The Nipper (1930)
Nipples & Palm Trees (2012)
Nippu (2012)
Nippu Ravva (1993)
Nippulanti Manishi: (1974 & 1986)
Nipputo Chelagaatam (1982)
Nirahua Chalal London (2019)
Nirahua Hindustani (2014)
Nirahua Hindustani 2 (2017)
Nirahua Hindustani 3 (2018)
Nirai Kudam (1969)
Nirakazhcha (2010)
Nirakkoottu (1985)
Nirakudam (1977)
Nirala (1950)
Nirali Duniya (1940)
Niram (1999)
Niram Maaratha Pookkal (1979)
Niram Marunna Nimishangal (1982)
Niramaala (1975)
Niramulla Ravulkal (1986)
Nirantharam (1995)
Niraparaadhi (1984)
Nirbaak (2015)
Nirbachana (1994)
Nirbashito (2014)
Nirbhay (1996)
Nirdoshi: (1951 & 1967)
Nirmala: (1938 & 1948)
Nirmalyam (1973)
Nirnayakam (2015)
Nirupedalu (1954)
Nirvana (1997)
Nirvana Street Murder (1990)

Nis–Niz

Nisabdham (2017)
Nisala Gira (2007)
Nise: The Heart of Madness (2015)
Nisekoi (2018)
Nishaan (1983)
Nishabd (2007)
Nishabdham (2020)
Nishad (2002)
Nishagandhi (1970)
Nishan: (1965 & 1978)
Nishana: (1980 & 1995)
Nishane Bazi (1989)
Nishant (1975)
Nishedhi (1984)
Nishi Ginza Station (1958)
Nishi Padma (1970)
Nishi Trishna (1989)
Nishkarsha (1993)
Nishpap Asami (1997)
Nishpap Munna (2013)
Nit-Witty Kitty (1951)
Nitchevo: (1926 & 1936)
Nite Tales: The Movie (2008)
Nithyaharitha Nayakan (2018)
Nithyakanyaka (1963)
Nitram (2021)
Nitrate Kisses (1992)
Nitro (2007)
Nitro Circus: The Movie (2012)
Nitti: The Enforcer (1988 TV)
The Nitwits (1935)
Niuma (2010)
Nivedyam (1978)
Nivuru Gappina Nippu (1982)
Nix on Dames (1929)
Nixchen: (1920 & 1926)
Nixon (1995)
Nixon's China Game (2000)
Niyamam Enthucheyyum (1990)
Nizhal Moodiya Nirangal (1983)
Nizhal Nijamagiradhu (1978)
Nizhal Thedum Nenjangal (1982)
Nizhal Yudham (1981)
Nizhalattam (1970)
Nizhalgal (1980)
Nizhalkuthu (2002)

Nj-Nn

Njaan (2014)
Njaan Njaan Maathram (1978)
Njai Dasima: (1929 & 1932)
Njan Ekananu (1982)
Njan Gandharvan (1991)
Njan Kathorthirikkum (1986)
Njan Kodiswaran (1994)
Njan Marykutty (2018)
Njan Ninne Premikkunnu (1975)
Njan Ninnodu Koodeyundu (2015)
Njan Piranna Nattil (1985)
Njan Prakashan (2018)
Njan Samvidhanam Cheyyum (2015)
Njan Steve Lopez (2014)
Njandukalude Nattil Oridavela (2017)
Njangal Santhushtaranu (1999)
Njangalude Veettile Athidhikal (2014)
Njanum Ente Familiyum (2012)
Njattadi (1979)
Njavalppazhangal (1976)
Njësiti guerril (1969)
Njinga: Queen Of Angola (2013)
Nna Thaan Case Kodu (2022)
Nneka the Pretty Serpent: (1994 & 2020)

No

No: (1998 & 2012)
No Babies Wanted (1928)
No Bears (2022)
No Bed of Roses (2017)
No Bigger than a Minute (2006)
No Blade of Grass (1970)
No Blood No Tears (2002)
No Boyfriend Since Birth (2015)
No Breathing (2013)
No Burqas Behind Bars (2013)
No Census, No Feeling (1940)
No Child of Mine (1997)
No Clue (2013)
No Code of Conduct (1998)
No Contest (1995)
No Contest II (1997)
No Country for Old Men (2007)
No Crossover: The Trial of Allen Iverson (2010)
No Date, No Signature (2017)
No Day Without You (1933)
No Defense (1929)
No Deposit (2015)
No Deposit, No Return (1976)
No Dessert, Dad, till You Mow the Lawn (1994)
No Direction Home (2005)
No Distance Left to Run (2010)
No Dough Boys (1944)
No Down Payment (1957)
No Drums, No Bugles (1972)
No End (1985)
No End in Sight (2007)
No Entrance (1960)
No Entry (2005)
No Entry Pudhe Dhoka Aahey (2012)
No Escape: (1934, 1936, 1953, 1994 & 2015)
No Evidence of Disease (2013)
No Exit: (1930, 1962, 1995 & 2022)
No Fathers in Kashmir (2019)
No Fear, No Die (1990)
No Filter (2016)
No Funny Business (1933)
No Game, No Life Zero (2017)
No God, No Master (2012)
No Gold for a Dead Diver (1974)
No Good Deed: (2002, 2014 & 2017)
No Greater Glory (1934)
No Greater Law (2018)
No Greater Love: (1952, 1960, 1996 & 2010)
No Hair Day (1999)
No Hands on the Clock (1941)
No Highway in the Sky (1951)
No Holds Barred: (1952 & 1989)
No Home Movie (2015)
No Hunting (1955)
No Impact Man (2009)
No Joke (2013)
No Kidding (1960)
No Lady (1931)
No Land's Song (2014)
No Leave, No Love (1946)
No Letting Go (2015)
No Lies (1973)
No Limit: (1931, 1935, 2006 & 2011)
No Limit Kids: Much Ado About Middle School (2010)
No Lonely Angels (2002)
No Longer 17 (2003)
No Looking Back (1998)
No Love for Johnnie (1961)
No Man of God (2021)
No Man of Her Own: (1932 & 1950)
No Man Is an Island (1962)
No Man's Gold (1926)
No Man's Land: (1918, 1939, 1984, 1985, 1987, 2001 & 2013)
No Man's Law (1927)
No Man's Range (1935)
No Man's Woman (1955)
No Manches Frida (2016)
No Manches Frida 2 (2019)
No Maps for These Territories (2000)
No Marriage Ties (1933) 
No Me Digas Solterona (2018)
No Men Beyond This Point (2015)
No Mercy: (1986, 2010 & 2019)
The No Mercy Man (1973)
No Mercy for the Rude (2006)
No Minor Vices (1948)
No Money Needed (1932)
No Monkey Business (1935)
No More Easy Life (1979)
No More Hiroshima (1984)
No More Ladies (1935)
No More Love (1931)
No More Love, No More Death (1993)
No More Mr. Nice Guy (1993)
No More Orchids (1932)
No More Sunsets (2006)
No More Tears Sister (2005)
No More Women (1934)
No Mother to Guide Her (1923)
No My Darling Daughter (1961)
No Name on the Bullet (1959)
No Names on the Doors (1997)
No Night Is Too Long (2002)
No No Sleep (2015)
No No: A Dockumentary (2014)
No Noise (1923)
No Nukes (1980)
No One Gets Out Alive (2021)
No One Killed Jessica (2011)
No One Lives (2013)
No One Will Play with Me (1976)
No One Would Tell (1996)
No Orchids for Miss Blandish (1948)
No Regret (2006)
No Regrets for Our Youth (1946)
No Reservations (2007)
No Retreat, No Surrender (1986)
No Retreat, No Surrender 2 (1988)
No Right Turn (2009)
No Rules (2005)
No Skin Off My Ass (1991)
No Small Affair (1984)
No Smoking: (1951 & 2007)
No sos vos, soy yo (2004)
No Strings Attached (2011)
No Such Thing (2002)
No Sudden Move (2021)
No Surgery Hours Today (1948)
No Surrender (1985)
No Tears for the Dead (2014)
No Time for Love (1943)
No Time for Nuts (2006)
No Time for Sergeants (1958)
 No Through Road (2008)
No Way Back: (1949, 1953, 1976 & 1995)
No Way Home (1996)
No Way Out: (1950, 1973 & 1987)
No Way to Treat a Lady (1968)

Noa–Nob

Noa at 17 (1982)
Noah: (1998, 2013 & 2014)
The Noah (1975)
Noah's Arc: Jumping the Broom (2008)
Noah's Arc: The Short Film (2004)
Noah's Ark: (1928, 1999 TV & 2007)
The Noah's Ark Principle (1984)
Nob Hill (1945)
Nobel Son (2006)
Nobel's Last Will (2012)
Nobelity (2006)
The Noble Family (2013)
Noble Savage (2018)
A Noble Spirit (2014)
Noblemen (2017)
Nobleza baturra (1935)
Nobleza gaucha: (1915 & 1937)
Nobleza ranchera (1977)
Nobody: (1921 & 2021)
Nobody Dies Twice (1953)
Nobody Gets Out Alive (2012)
Nobody Home (1919)
Nobody Knows: (1920, 1970 & 2004)
Nobody Knows About Sex (2006)
Nobody Knows Anybody (1999)
Nobody Lives Forever (1946)
Nobody, Nobody But... Juan (2009)
Nobody Ordered Love (1972)
Nobody Owns Me (2013)
Nobody Runs Forever (1968)
Nobody Sleeps in the Woods Tonight (2020)
Nobody Speak: Trials of the Free Press (2017)
Nobody Walks (2012)
Nobody Waved Good-bye (1964)
Nobody Will Know (1953)
Nobody Will Speak of Us When We're Dead (1995)
Nobody's Baby: (1937 & 2001)
Nobody's Boy (1913)
Nobody's Darling (1943)
Nobody's Daughter (1976)
Nobody's Daughter Haewon (2013)
Nobody's Fool: (1921, 1936, 1986, 1994 & 2018)
Nobody's Money (1923)
Nobody's Perfect: (1968, 1990 & 2004)
Nobody's Perfekt (1981)
Nobody's Son (1917)
Nobody's Widow (1927)
Nobody's Wife: (1937 & 1950)
Nobunaga Concerto (2016)

Noc–Nom

Noc nevěsty (1967)
Noc Walpurgi (2015)
Nocebo (2023)
Una Noche (2012)
La noche del pecado (1933)
Una Noche en El Relámpago (1950)
Nocturama (2016)
Nocturna (2007)
Nocturna Artificialia (1979)
Nocturna: Granddaughter of Dracula (1979)
Nocturnal Animals (2016)
Nocturnal Butterfly (1941)
Nocturne: (1946, 2019 & 2020)
Nocturne 29 (1968)
Nocturne Indien (1989)
Nocturne of Love: (1919 & 1948)
Nøddebo Præstegård: (1934 & 1974)
Nodi Swamy Navirodu Hige (1983)
Nodir Naam Modhumoti (1996)
Nodo jimankyō jidai (1949)
Noel (2004)
Noël Noël (2003)
Noel's Fantastic Trip (1983)
Noelle (2019)
Noëlle (2007)
Noi the Albino (2003)
Noi credevamo (2010)
Noi peccatori (1953)
Noi siamo due evasi (1959)
Noi siamo le colonne (1956)
Noi uomini duri (1987)
Noir (2015)
Noir et Blanc (1986)
Noir Drive (2008)
Noirs et blancs en couleur (1976)
Noise: (2007 American & 2007 Australian)
A Noise from the Deep (1913)
The Noiseless Dead (1946)
Noises Off (1992)
A Noisy Household (1946)
Noisy Noises (1929)
Noita palaa elämään (1952)
Noites Cariocas (1936)
Nokas (2010)
Nokkethadhoorathu Kannum Nattu (1985)
Nokkukuthi (1983)
Nola (2003)
Nola and the Clones (2016)
Nollywood Babylon (2008)
Nolok (2019)
The Noltenius Brothers (1945)
Nomad: (1982 & 2005)
Nomad: In the Footsteps of Bruce Chatwin (2019)
Nomad: The Warrior (2005)
Nomadland (2020)
Nomads: (1986 & 2010)
Nomads of the North (1920)
Nombarathi Poovu (1987)
The Nomi Song (2004)
Nommara 17 (1989)
Nomu (1974)

Non

Non-chan Kumo ni Noru (1955)
Non ci resta che il crimine (2019)
Non-Fiction (2018)
Non è vero... ma ci credo (1952)
Non ho paura di vivere (1952)
Non me lo dire! (1940)
Non pensarci (2007)
Non perdiamo la testa (1959)
Non son degno di te (1965)
Non-Stop (2014)
The Non-Stop Flight (1926)
The Non-Stop Fright (1927)
The Non-Stop Kid (1918)
Non-Stop New York (1937)
Non ti pago! (1942)
The Nona Tapes (1995)
Nonchan Noriben (2009)
None but the Brave: (1928, 1960 & 1965)
None Less Than Heroes: The Honor Flight Story (2011) 
None but the Lonely Heart (1944)
None Shall Escape (1944)
The Nonentity (1922)
Nongjungjo (1926)
Nonnie & Alex (1995)
Nonsense Revolution (2008)

Noo–Nop

Noo Hin: The Movie (2006)
Noobz (2012)
Noodle (2007)
Nool Veli (1979)
Noon (1968)
The Noon of the 10th Day (1988)
The Noon Gun (2004)
Noon at Ngayon: Pagsasamang Kay Ganda (2003)
Noon Sunday (1970)
The Noon Whistle (1923)
Noor Jahaan (2018)
Noor Jehan (1967)
Noor pensionär (1972)
Nooravathu Naal (1984)
Noored kotkad (1927)
Noorondu Nenapu (2017)
Nooru Janmaku (2010)
Noose: (1948 & 1958)
The Noose (1928)
A Noose for Django (1969)
Noose for a Gunman (1960)
The Noose Hangs High (1948)
Noose for a Lady (1953)
Noothi Lo Kappalu (2015)
Nootrukku Nooru (1971)
Nope (2022)

Nor

Nor the Moon by Night (1958)
Nora: (1923, 1944, 2000 & 2008)
Nora Prentiss (1947)
Nora's Hair Salon (2004)
Nora's Hair Salon 2: A Cut Above (2008)
Norbit (2007)
Noriega: God's Favorite (2000 TV)
The Norliss Tapes (1973 TV)
Norm of the North (2016)
Norma Jean & Marilyn (1996)
Norma Rae (1979)
Normais, Os – O Filme (2003)
Normal: (2003, 2007 & 2009)
Normal Adolescent Behavior (2007)
The Normal Heart (2014)
Normal Life (1996)
Normal Love (1963)
The Normals (2012)
Norman... Is That You? (1976)
The Norman Rockwell Code (2006)
Norman Rockwell's World... An American Dream (1972)
Noroi: The Curse (2005)
The Norseman (1978)
El Norte (1983)
Norte, the End of History (2013)
North: (1994 & 2009)
North 24 Kaatham (2013)
North to Alaska (1960)
The North Avenue Irregulars (1979)
North Country (2005)
North Dallas Forty (1979)
North East Past: Po Ma Zhang Fei (2017)
North by Northwest (1959)
North Shore: (1949 & 1987)
North Star: (1925 & 1996)
The North Star: (1943 & 2016)
North West Mounted Police (1940)
The North Wind (2021)
Northanger Abbey: (1987 TV & 2007 TV)
The Northbound Limited (1927)
A Northern Affair (2014)
 Northern Lights (2009)
The Northerners (1992)
Northfork (2003)
The Northlander (2016)
The Northman (2022)
Northwest Passage (1940)
Norwegian Wood (2010)
The Norwood Necklace (1911)

Nos

Nos 18 ans (2008)
À Nos Amours (1983)
Nos dicen las intocables (1964)
Nos lleva la tristeza (1965)
Nos miran (2002)
Nos vemos, papá (2011)
The Nose (1977 TV)
The Nose or the Conspiracy of Mavericks (2020)
Nose, Iranian Style (2005)
Nosey Parker (2003)
Nosferatu (1922)
Nosferatu the Vampyre (1979)
Noson Lawen (1949)
Nosotras las Taquígrafas (1950)
Nosotros los feos (1973)
Nosotros los Pobres (1948)
Nostalghia (1983)
Nostalgia: (1971 & 2018)
Nostalgia for the Light (2011)
The Nostalgist (2014)
Nostradamus: (1925 & 1994)
The Nostradamus Kid (1992)

Not

Not Afraid of Big Animals (1953)
Not Angels But Angels (1994)
Not Another Happy Ending (2013)
Not Another Not Another Movie (2011)
Not Another Teen Movie (2001)
Not Any Weekend for Our Love (1950)
Not Bad for a Girl (1995)
Not Cool (2014)
Not Damaged (1930)
Not a Drum Was Heard (1924)
Not Easily Broken (2009)
Not Everybody's Lucky Enough to Have Communist Parents (1993)
Not Evil Just Wrong (2009)
Not Exactly Gentlemen (1931)
Not Fade Away (2012)
Not a Feather, but a Dot (2012)
Not For, or Against (2003)
Not Forgotten (2009)
Not Going Quietly (2021)
Not Guilty: (1908, 1910, 1919 & 1947)
Not Here to Be Loved (2005)
Not Human (2013)
Not a Ladies' Man (1942)
Not Like Everyone Else (2006)
Not Like Us (1995)
Not on the Lips (2003)
Not Love, Just Frenzy (1996)
Not a Love Story (2011)
Not a Love Story: A Film About Pornography (1982)
Not Me! (1996)
Not Much Force (1915)
Not My Day (2014)
Not My Kid (1985)
 Not My Life (2006)
Not My Life (2011)
Not My Sister (1916)
Not My Type (2014)
Not with My Wife, You Don't! (1966)
Not Negotiable (1918)
Not Now (1936)
Not Now, Comrade (1976)
Not Now, Darling (1973)
Not Okay (2022)
Not One Less (1999)
Not Only But Always (2004)
Not Only Mrs. Raut (2003)
Not like Others (2008)
Not for Ourselves Alone (1999)
Not a Photograph: The Mission of Burma Story (2006)
Not for Publication: (1927 & 1984)
Not a Pretty Picture (1976)
Not Quite Decent (1929)
Not Quite Hollywood: The Wild, Untold Story of Ozploitation! (2008) 
Not Quite Human (1987)
Not Quite Human II (1989)
Not Quite a Lady (1928)
Not Quite Paradise (1985)
Not Reconciled (1965)
Not Safe for Work (2014)
Not for Sale (1924)
Not Since You (2009)
Not So Dumb (1930)
Not So Dusty: (1936 & 1956)
Not So Long Ago (1925)
Not So Quiet (1930)
Not So Quiet on the Western Front (1930)
Not as a Stranger (1955)
Not So Stupid: (1928 & 1946)
Not Suitable for Children (2012)
Not of This Earth: (1957, 1988 & 1995)
Not Three (1964)
Not Tonight Henry (1960)
Not Under the Jurisdiction (1969)
Not Wanted (1949)
Not Wanted on Voyage (1957)
Not Waving but Drowning (2012)
Not Without Gisela (1951)
Not Without My Daughter (1991)
Not Without My Handbag (1993)
Not of the Woman Born (1918)
Not a Word About Love (1937)
Not of this World (1999)
Not Worth a Fig (2009)
Not Your Typical Bigfoot Movie (2008)
Notch Number One (1924)
Note (2015)
The Note (2007)
Note by Note: The Making of Steinway L1037 (2007)
Note Out (2011)
A Note of Triumph: The Golden Age of Norman Corwin (2005)
Notebook: (2006, 2013 & 2019)
The Notebook: (2004 & 2013)
The Notebooks of Memory (2009)
Notes (2013)
Notes on Blindness (2016)
Notes to Eternity (2016)
Notes for a Film About Donna and Gail (1966)
Notes of Love (1998)
Notes for My Son (2020)
Notes on the Port of St. Francis (1951)
Notes on a Scandal (2007)
Notes Towards an African Orestes (1970)
Notes to You (1941)
Notfilm (2015)
Nothing (2004)
Nothing Bad Can Happen (2013)
Nothing Barred (1961)
Nothing but the Blues (1995)
Nothing But Coincidence (1949)
Nothing But Lies (1991)
Nothing But Pleasure (1940)
Nothing But the Truth: (1929, 1941, 2008 American & 2008 South African)
Nothing but the Best (1964)
Nothing by Chance (1975)
Nothing in Common (1986)
Nothing to Declare (2010)
Nothing Else Matters (1920)
The Nothing Factory (2017)
Nothing Funny (1995)
Nothing Has Ever Happened Here (2016)
Nothing to Hide: (1981 & 2018)
Nothing like the Holidays (2008)
Nothing Lasts Forever (1984)
Nothing Left to Do But Cry (1984)
Nothing Left to Fear (2013)
Nothing Left Unsaid: Gloria Vanderbilt & Anderson Cooper (2016)
Nothing Less Than an Archangel (1960)
Nothing Less Than a Real Man (1972)
Nothing but Life (2004)
Nothing Like a Dame (2018)
Nothing Like Experience (1970)
Nothing Like Publicity (1936)
Nothing to Lose: (1997 & 2002)
Nothing but a Man (1964)
Nothing More (2001)
Nothing More Than a Woman (1934)
Nothing but the Night (1973)
Nothing Personal: (1980, 1995, 2007 & 2009)
Nothing in Return (2015)
Nothing Sacred (1937)
Nothing Shall Be Hidden (1912)
Nothing So Strange (2002)
Nothing but Trouble: (1918, 1944 & 1991)
Nothing but the Truth: (1929, 1941, 2008 American & 2008 South African)
Nothing Underneath (1985)
Nothing Venture (1948)
Nothing to Wear (1928)
Nothing's All Bad (2010)
The Notice of the Day (2001)
Notizie degli scavi (2010)
Notoriety (2013)
Notorious: (1946 & 2009)
Notorious but Nice (1933)
Notorious Gallagher (1916)
A Notorious Affair (1930)
The Notorious Bettie Page (2005)
The Notorious Elinor Lee (1940)
The Notorious Lady (1927)
The Notorious Landlady (1962)
The Notorious Lone Wolf (1946)
The Notorious Mr. Bout (2014)
The Notorious Mr. Monks (1958)
The Notorious Mrs. Carrick (1924)
The Notorious Mrs. Sands (1920)
The Notorious Sophie Lang (1934)
Notre Dame van de sloppen (1940)
Notre musique (2004)
Notre Paradis (2011)
Notre univers impitoyable (2008)
Nottam (2006)
La Notte (1961)
Una notte, un sogno (1988)
Le Notti Bianche (1957)
Notting Hill (1999)
Notturno (2020)

Nou–Nov

Noukadubi: (1947 & 2011)
Nous aurons toute la mort pour dormir (1977)
Nous, princesses de Clèves (2011)
À Nous la Liberté (1931)
Nousukausi (2003)
Nouvelle Vague (1990)
Nova Zembla (2011)
Novel (2008)
Novel with a Double Bass (1911)
Novel Romance (2006)
A Novel Romance (2011)
The Novel of Werther (1938)
The Novelist's Film (2022)
Novelle licenziose di vergini vogliose (1973)
November: (2004, 2017 & 2021)
November 1st (2019)
November Christmas (2010 TV) 
November Criminals (2017)
The November Man (2014)
Novemberinte Nashtam (1982)
November Rain: (2007 & 2014)
The Novena (2005)
Novia a la medida (1949)
Novia, esposa y amante (1980)
A Novice at X-Rays (1898)
Noviembre (2003)
Novio, marido y amante (1948)
Novitiate (2017)
Novocaine (2001)

Now-Noz

Now Add Honey (2015)
Now Barabbas (1949)
Now Do You Get It Why I'm Crying? (1969)
Now and Ever (2019)
Now & Forever (2002)
Now and Forever: (1934, 1956, 1983 & 2006)
Now Hare This (1958)
Now Hear This (1963)
Now I Am Rich (1952)
Now I'll Tell (1934)
Now I'll Tell One (1927)
Now Is Everything (2019)
Now Is Good (2012)
Now Is the Time (2019)
Now or Never: (1921, 1935, 1998 & 2003)
Now That April's Here (1958)
Now That I Have You (2004)
Now That Summer is Gone (1938)
Now — The Peace (1945)
Now and Then (1995)
Now You See Love, Now You Don't (1992)
Now You See Him, Now You Don't (1972)
Now You See Me (2013)
Now You See Me 2 (2016)
Now You Know (2002)
Now, Forager (2012)
Now, Voyager (1942)
Now's the Time (1932)
Nowhere (1997)
Nowhere in Africa (2001)
Nowhere Boy (2009)
Nowhere Boys: The Book of Shadows (2016)
Nowhere to Go (1958)
Nowhere to Hide: (1987, 1994 TV & 1999)
The Nowhere Inn (2020)
Nowhere Left to Run (2010)
Nowhere to Run: (1978 TV, 1989, 1993 & 2015)
The Nowhere Son (2013)
Nowhere Special (2020)
Noy (2010)
Noy Number Bipod Sanket (2007)
Noyonmoni (1976)
Nozoki Ana (2014)

Nr

Nrithasala (1972)

Nu

Nu går den på Dagmar (1972)
Nu-Meri: Book of the New Spawn (2008)

Nua–Nul

Nua Bou (1962)
Nuan (2003)
Nuba Conversations (2000)
Nubes de humo (1958)
Nucingen House (2008)
Nuclear Tipping Point (2010)
Nude: (2017 & 2018)
Nude Actress Murder Case: Five Criminals (1957)
The Nude Bomb (1980)
Nude in Charcoal (1961)
Nude Fear (1998)
Nude on the Moon (1961)
Nude Nuns with Big Guns (2010)
The Nude Restaurant (1967)
Nude for Satan (1974)
Nude with Violin (1964)
The Nude Woman: (1922, 1926 & 1932)
Nudist Colony of the Dead (1991)
The Nudist Story (1960)
Nueba Yol (1995)
Nueve reinas (2000)
Nugam (2013)
The Nugget (2002)
Nugget Nell (1919)
The Nuisance: (1921 & 1933)
Nuit 1 (2010)
Nuit d'ivresse (1986)
Nuit de chien (2008)
Nuit noire 17 octobre 1961 (2005)
Nuits Rouges (1974)
Nukie (1987)
Nulli Novikkathe (1985)

Num–Nun

Numa Numa (2005)
Numafung (2004)
Numb: (2007 & 2015)
Numba Nadan Apita Pissu (2003)
The Number (2017)
Number 1 Cheerleader Camp (2010)
Number 13 (1922)
Number 13 (2006) (TV)
Number 17: (1928 & 1949)
The Number 23 (2007)
Number 55 (2014)
Number 111: (1919 & 1938)
The Number on Great-Grandpa's Arm (2018)
Number One: (1969, 1973, 1994 & 2017) 
Number One with a Bullet (1987)
Number One Fan (2014)
Number One Shakib Khan (2010)
Number Our Days (1976)
Number, Please (1931)
Number, Please? (1920)
Number Seventeen (1932)
Number Ten Blues (1975)
Number Two (1975)
Numbered Men (1930)
Numbered Woman (1938)
The Numbers Start with the River (1971)
The Numbers Station (2013)
Numbri Aadmi (1991)
Numm (2013)
The Nun: (1966, 2005, 2013 & 2018)
The Nun 2 (2023)
The Nun and the Bandit (1992)
A Nun at the Crossroads (1967)
The Nun and the Devil (1973)
The Nun and the Harlequin (1918)
The Nun and the Sergeant (1962)
The Nun's Night (1967)
The Nun's Story (1959)
Nunca pasa nada (1963)
Nungambakkam (2020)
Nungshi Feijei (2015)
Nungshit Mapi (2015)
Nunnunarvu (2016)
Nuns on the Run (1990)
Nunzio (1978)

Nuo–Nuv

Nuovomondo (2006)
Nur eine Frau (1958)
Nur Kasih The Movie (2011)
Nurayum Pathayum (1977)
Nuregami kenpō (1958)
Nuremberg (2000)
Nuremberg: The Nazis Facing their Crimes (2006)
Nuremberg Trials (1947)
Nurit (1972)
Nurmoo: Shout from the Plain (2009)
Nurse (1969)
The Nurse: (1912 & 2017)
Nurse 3D (2013)
Nurse Betty (2000)
The Nurse from Brooklyn (1938)
Nurse Cavell (1916)
Nurse Edith Cavell (1939)
Nurse.Fighter.Boy (2008)
Nurse Marjorie (1920)
The Nurse in the Military Madhouse (1979)
Nurse Report (1972)
Nurse Sherri (1978)
Nurse on Wheels (1963)
The Nurse's Secret (1941)
The Nursemaid Who Disappeared (1939)
The Nurses (1984)
Nursie! Nursie! (1916)
Nursing a Viper (1909)
The Nut (1921)
The Nut Farm (1935)
The Nut Job (2014)
The Nut Job 2: Nutty by Nature (2017)
Nutcase (1980)
Nutcracker (1982)
The Nutcracker: (1967, 1973 & 1993)
The Nutcracker in 3D (2010)
Nutcracker Fantasy (1979)
The Nutcracker and the Four Realms (2018)
Nutcracker: The Motion Picture (1986)
The Nutcracker Prince (1990)
The Nutcracker Story (2017)
The Nuthouse (1951)
Nuts: (1987, 2012 & 2018)
Nuts! (2016)
Nuts & Bolts (2003)
Nuts for Love (2000)
Nuts in May: (1917 & 1976)
Nuts and Volts (1964)
The Nutt House (1992)
The Nuttiest Nutcracker (1999)
Nutty, Naughty Chateau (1963)
Nutty News (1942)
Nutty but Nice (1940)
The Nutty Professor: (1963, 1996 & 2008)
Nutty Professor II: The Klumps (2000)
Nuummioq (2009)
Nuvva Nena (2012)
Nuvvala Nenila (2013)
Nuvvante Naakishtam (2005)
Nuvve Kavali (2000)
Nuvve Nuvve (2002)
Nuvvekkadunte Nenakkadunta (2012)
Nuvvila (2011)
Nuvvostanante Nenoddantana (2005)
Nuvvu Leka Nenu Lenu (2002)
Nuvvu Naaku Nachav (2001)
Nuvvu Nenu (2001)
Nuvvu Thopu Raa (2019)
Nuvvu Vastavani (2000)

Ny–Nz

Nya (2017)
Nya hyss av Emil i Lönneberga (1972)
Nyay Anyay (1990) 
Nyaya Ellide (1982)
Nyaya Gedditu (1983)
Nyaya Neethi Dharma (1980)
Nyaya Tharasu (1989)
Nyayam Kavali (1981)
Nyayam Ketkirom (1973)
Nyayam Meere Cheppali (1985)
Nyayave Devaru (1971)
Nyayavidhi (1986)
Nyaydaata (1999)
Nyaay: The Justice (2021)
Nyad (TBD)
Nyay Anyay (1990)
Nyaya Ellide (1982)
Nyaya Gedditu (1983)
Nyaya Neethi Dharma (1980)
Nyaya Tharasu (1989)
Nyayam Kavali (1981)
Nyayam Ketkirom (1973)
Nyayam Meere Cheppali (1985)
Nyayangal Jayikkattum (1990)
Nyayave Devaru (1971)
Nyayavidhi (1986)
Nyfes (2004)
Nymph: (1973 & 2009)
The Nymph (1996)
Nymphomaniac (2013)
Nzambi Mpungu (1928)

O

O (2001)
O21 (2014)
O Amor Natural (1996)
O Baby! Yentha Sakkagunnave (2019)
O-Bi, O-Ba: The End of Civilization (1985)
O Bobo (1987)
O, Brazen Age (2015)
O Brother, Where Art Thou? (2000)
O Canada! (1981)
O Cangaceiro (1953)
O Carnaval Cantado de 1932 (1932)
O Carteiro (2011)
O Casamento de Romeu e Julieta (2005)
O Chinadana (2002)
O Circo das Qualidades Humanas (2000)
O.C. and Stiggs (1987)
O... Çocuklari (2008)
O Concurso (2013)
O Ébrio (1946)
O Fantasma (2000)
O Friend, This Waiting! (2012)
O.G. (2018)
O Garimpeiro (1920)
OHMS (1980)
O.H.M.S. (1937)
O Homem Que Copiava (2003)
O' Horten (2007)
O.J.: Made in America (2016)
The O. J. Simpson Story (1995)
O Jogo da Vida (1977)
o.k. (1970)
OK Baytong (2003)
OK Connery (1967)
OK Garage (1998)
OK, Good (2012)
O.K. ... Laliberté (1973) 
O.K. Nerone (1951)
The O'Kalems Visit Killarney (1912)
O-Kay for Sound (1937)
O Lucky Man!: (1973 & 2009)
O'Malley of the Mounted: (1921 & 1936)
OMG, I'm a Robot! (2015)
OMG – Oh My God! (2012)
OMG... We're in a Horror Movie!!! (2015)
O, more, more! (1983)
O, My Darling Clementine (1943)
O Nanna Nalle (2000)
The O'Neill (1912)
O Noviço Rebelde (1997)
O Pagador de Promessas (1962)
Ó Paí, Ó (2007)
O Pioneers! (1992)
O'Shaughnessy's Boy (1935)
O.S.S. (1946)
OSS 117 series:
OSS 117 Is Not Dead (1957)
OSS 117 Is Unleashed (1963) 
Shadow of Evil (1964)
OSS 117 Mission for a Killer (1965)
Atout cœur à Tokyo pour OSS 117 (1966)
OSS 117 – Double Agent (1968)
OSS 117 Takes a Vacation (1970)
OSS 117: Cairo, Nest of Spies (2006)
OSS 117: Lost in Rio (2009)
OSS 117: From Africa with Love (2021)
OSS 77 – Operazione fior di loto (1965)
O Shaolin do Sertão (2016)
O'Shaughnessy's Boy (1935)
O-Solar Meow (1967)
OT: Our Town (2002)
O-Town (2015)
O, Vrba (1945)

Oa–Ob

The Oak (1992)
The Oak Room (2020)
Oasis: (1955 & 2002)
The Oasis (2008)
Oasis of Fear (1971)
Oasis of the Zombies (1981)
The Oath: (1921 American, 1921 British, 2010, 2016 & 2018)
Oath-Bound (1922)
The Oath and the Man (1910)
The Oath of Peter Hergatz (1921)
The Oath of Pierre (1913)
The Oath of Stephan Huller (1921)
The Oath of Tsuru San (1913)
Oath of Vengeance (1944)
Oba: The Last Samurai (2011)
Oba Koheda Priye (2001)
Oba Nathuwa Oba Ekka (2012)
Obaltan (1960)
Obeah! (1935)
Oberst Redl (1985)
Obey Giant (2017)
Obey the Law: (1926 & 1933)
Obhishopto Nighty (2014)
Obit (2016)
The Object of Beauty (1991)
The Object of My Affection (1998)
Objectified (2009)
The Objective (2008)
Objective, Burma! (1945)
The Obligin' Buckaroo (1927)
Obliging Young Lady (1942)
Oblique (2008)
Oblivion: (1994 & 2013)
Oblivion 2: Backlash (1996)
Oblivion Island: Haruka and the Magic Mirror (2009)
Oblivion, Nebraska (2006)
Oblivious (2001)
The Oblong Box (1969)
Obon Brothers (2015)
Oboreru Knife (2016)
Obselidia (2010)
Observe and Report (2009)
Obsessed: (1987, 1992, 2009 & 2014)
The Obsessed of Catule (1965)
Obsession: (1949, 1954, 1976 & 1997)
Obsession: Radical Islam's War Against the West (2005)
Obsessive Love (1984 TV)
An Obsolete Altar (2013)
The Obtrusive Wife (1953)
Obvious Child (2014)
An Obvious Situation (1930)

Oc

Ocaña, an Intermittent Portrait (1978)
El ocaso del socialismo mágico (2016)
The Ocarina (1919)
Occhio, malocchio, prezzemolo e finocchio (1983)
Occident (2002)
Occult (2009)
Occupant (2011)
Occupation (2018)
Occupation in 26 Pictures (1978)
Occupation 101 (2006)
Occupation: Dreamland (2005)
Occupation: Rainfall (2020)
Occupied Minds (2006)
An Occurrence at Owl Creek Bridge (1962)
Ocean (2002)
The Ocean (2006)
Ocean Breakers (1935)
Ocean of Fear (2007 TV)
Ocean Heaven (2010)
Ocean of Pearls (2008)
Ocean of Tears (2012)
Ocean Waves (1993)
Oceans (2009)
Ocean's series:
Ocean's Eleven: (1960 & 2001)
Ocean's Twelve (2004)
Ocean's Thirteen (2007)
Ocean's 8 (2018)
Ocean's Deadliest (2007)
Oceans of Fire (1986 TV)
Oceanus: Act One (2015)
OceanWorld 3D (2009)
Oconomowoc (2013)
The Octagon (1980)
Octaman (1971) 
Octane (2003)
Octavia (1984)
Octavio Is Dead! (2018)
October: (2010 & 2018)
October 22 (1998)
October Days (1958)
October Gale (2014)
The October Man (1947)
October Moon (2005)
October November (2013)
October Sky (1999)
October: Ten Days That Shook the World (1928)
Octopus 2: River of Fear (2001)
Octopussy (1983)
The Octoroon: (1909 & 1912)
Oculus (2013)

Od

Odaruthammava Aalariyam (1984)
Odayil Ninnu (1965)
The Odd Angry Shot (1979)
Odd Couple (1979)
The Odd Couple (1968)
The Odd Couple II (1998)
The Odd Family: Zombie On Sale (2019)
Odd Girl Out (2005 TV)
Odd Job (2016)
The Odd Job (1978)
Odd Jobs (1986)
The Odd Life of Timothy Green (2012)
Odd Man Out (1947)
Odd Thomas (2013)
The Odd Way Home (2013)
Oddball (2015)
Oddball Hall (1991)
The Odds Against (1966)
The Odds Against Her (1919)
Odds Against Tomorrow (1959)
The Oddsockeaters (2016)
The Ode (2008)
Ode to Joy (2019)
Odette: (1916, 1928, 1934 & 1950)
Odette Toulemonde (2006)
The Odessa File (1974)
Odongo (1956)
Odor of the Day (1948)
Odor-able Kitty (1945)
Odour of Chrysanthemums (2002)
Odysseus and the Isle of the Mists (2008)
Odysseus' Gambit (2011)
The Odyssey (2016)
An Odyssey of the North (1914)

Oe–Og

Oedipus the King (1968)
Oedipus Mayor (1996)
Oedipus Orca (1977)
Oedipus Rex: (1957 & 1967)
Of All the Things (2012)
Of Cash and Hash (1955)
Of Course, the Motorists (1959)
Of Dolls and Murder (2012)
Of Fathers and Sons (2017)
Of Feline Bondage (1965)
Of Fox and Hounds (1940)
Of Freaks and Men (1998)
Of Gods and Men (2010)
Of Horses and Men (2013)
Of Human Bondage: (1934, 1946 & 1964)
Of Human Hearts (1938)
Of Mice and Men: (1939, 1968 TV & 1992)
Of Time and the City (2008)
The Off Hours (2011)
Off Limits: (1953 & 1988)
Off the Map (2007)
Off the Ropes: (1999 & 2011)
Off Season: (1992 & 2012)
The Off Season (2004)
Off Sides (Pigs vs. Freaks) (1984 TV)
Off-Balance (2000)
The Off-Shore Pirate (1921)
The Offence (1973)
The Offenders (1921)
Office: (2015 Hong Kong & 2015 South Korean)
The Office (1966)
Office Christmas Party (2016)
Office Girls (2011)
Office Killer (1997)
The Office Manager (1931)
The Office Party (1976)
The Office Picnic (1972)
The Office Scandal (1929)
Office Space (1999)
The Office Wife: (1930 & 1934)
Officer: (2001 & 2018)
Officer 444 (1926)
Officer 666 (1916)
An Officer and a Car Salesman (1988 TV)
Officer Down (2013)
Officer Downe (2016)
Officer Duck (1939)
An Officer and a Gentleman (1982)
An Officer and a Murderer (2012 TV)
An Officer and a Spy (2019)
Officer Thirteen (1932)
The Officer's Swordknot (1915)
Officers (1971)
The Officers' Mess (1931)
The Officers' Ward (2001)
Official Competition (2021)
Official Secrets (2019)
The Official Story (1985)
OffOn (1972)
Offside: (2000, 2005, 2006 Iranian, 2006 Swedish & 2009)
Offspring: (1996 & 2009)
Oggi sposi: (1952 & 2009)
Oggy and the Cockroaches: The Movie (2013)
Ogo Bodhu Shundori (1981)
Ograblenie po... (1978)
Ogre (2008 TV)
The Ogre: (1989 & 1996)
The Ogre of Athens (1956)
Ogu and Mampato in Rapa Nui (2002)

Oh

Oh Billy, Behave (1926)
Oh Boy!: (1938 & 1991)
Oh Dad, Poor Dad, Mamma's Hung You in the Closet and I'm Feelin' So Sad (1967) 
Oh Doctor!: (1917 & 1925)
Oh! Heavenly Dog (1980)
Oh Johnny, How You Can Love (1940)
Oh La La! (2006)
Oh Lucy!: (2014 & 2017)
Oh Mabel (1924)
Oh Mary Be Careful (1921)
Oh Mong-nyeo (1937)
The Oh in Ohio (2006)
Oh My God: (2009 & 2015)
Oh! My God (2006)
Oh, My Nerves (1935)
Oh! My Zombie Mermaid (2004)
Oh No Doctor! (1934)
Oh Olsun (1973)
Oh Sailor Behave (1930)
Oh Schuks... I'm Gatvol (2004)
Oh Teacher (1927)
Oh! What a Lovely War (1969)
Oh Yaara Ainvayi Ainvayi Lut Gaya (2015)
Oh, God! (1977)
Oh, God! Book II (1980)
Oh, God! You Devil (1984)
Oh, Men! Oh, Women! (1957)
Oh, Mr. Porter! (1937)
Oh, Saigon (2007)
Oh, Susanna! (1936)
Oh, What a Night: (1935, 1944 & 1992)
Oh, You Women! (1919)
Oh... Rosalinda!! (1955)
Oha! Ako Pa?! (1994)
Ohan (1984)
Ohileshwara (1956)
Ohm Krüger (1941)
Ohm Shanthi Oshaana (2014)
Ohne Pass in fremden Betten (1965)
Ohoma Harida (2004)
Ohtlikud mängud (1974)

Oi–Oj

Oi kyries tis avlis (1967)
Oi paranomoi (1958)
Oi Thalassies oi Hadres (1967)
Oil (2009)
The Oil, the Baby and the Transylvanians (1981)
Oil Extraction (1907)
The Oil Factor (2005)
Oil Gobblers (1988)
The Oil Gush in Balakhany (1898)
The Oil Gush Fire in Bibiheybat (1898)
The Oil-Hell Murder (1992)
Oil on Ice (2004)
Oil Lamps (1971)
Oil for the Lamps of China (1935)
The Oil Prince (1965)
The Oil Raider (1934)
Oil Sands Karaoke (2013)
The Oil Sharks (1933)
Oil Storm (2005)
Oil and Water (1913)
Oil's Well (1929)
Oil's Well That Ends Well (1958)
Oily to Bed, Oily to Rise (1939)
Oily Hare (1952)
Oink (1995)
Oisin (1970)
Ojarumaru the Movie: The Promised Summer - Ojaru and Semira (2000)
Ojuju (2014)

Ok

Ok Jaanu (2017)
Ok-nyeo (1928)
Oka Chinna Maata (1997)
Oka Criminal Prema Katha (2014)
Oka Laila Kosam (2014)
Oka Manasu (2016)
Oka Oori Katha (1977)
Oka Oorilo (2005)
Oka Pellam Muddu Rendo Pellam Vaddu (2004)
Oka Radha Iddaru Krishnula Pelli (2003)
Oka Radha Iddaru Krishnulu (1986)
Oka Raju Oka Rani (2003)
Oka V Chitram (2006)
Okafor's Law (2016)
Okāsan no Ki (2015)
Okay, America! (1932)
Okay Bill (1971)
Oke Kutumbham (1970)
Oke Maata (2000)
Oki's Movie (2010)
Okie Noodling (2001)
Okinawa (1952)
Okinawa Rendez-vous (2000)
Okja (2017)
Okka Ammayi Thappa (2016)
Okka Kshanam (2017)
Okka Magaadu (2008)
Okkade (2005)
Okkadine (2013)
Okkadu (2003)
Okkadunnadu (2007)
Oklahoma Annie (1952)
Oklahoma Badlands (1948)
Oklahoma Blues (1948)
An Oklahoma Cowboy (1929)
Oklahoma Crude (1973)
Oklahoma Cyclone (1930)
Oklahoma Frontier (1939)
Oklahoma John (1965)
Oklahoma Justice (1951)
The Oklahoma Kid (1939)
Oklahoma Raiders (1944)
Oklahoma Renegades (1940)
Oklahoma Territory (1960)
Oklahoma Terror (1939)
The Oklahoma Woman (1956)
Oklahoma!: (1955 & 1999)
The Oklahoman (1957)
Oko proroka (1982)
Okoge (1992)
Okouzlená (1942)
Okraina: (1933 & 1998)
Oktoberfest (1987)
Okul (2004)

Ol
The Ol' Gray Hoss (1928)

Ola

Olaf—An Atom (1913)
Olaf's Frozen Adventure (2017 TV)
Olave Jeevana Lekkachaara (2009)
Olave Mandara (2011)
Olavina Aasare (1988)
Olavina Udugore (1987)
Olavu Geluvu (1977)
Olavu Moodidaga (1984)
Olavum Theeravum (1970)

Old

Old (2021)
Old 37 (2015)
Old Acquaintance (1943)
Old Age Handicap (1928)
The Old Army Game (1943)
The Old Bachelor's Dream (1913)
The Old Ballroom (1925)
Old Barge, Young Love: (1957 & 1973)
The Old Barn (1929)
The Old Barn Dance (1938)
Old Beast (2017)
Old Bill and Son (1941)
Old Bill Through the Ages (1924)
Old Bones of the River (1938)
The Old Bookkeeper (1912)
Old Boyfriends (1979)
Old Boys (2010)
Old Boys: The Way of the Dragon (2014)
Old Boys of Saint-Loup (1950)
The Old Bus (1934)
The Old Chisholm Trail (1942)
The Old Cinderella (2014)
The Old Cobbler (1914)
The Old Code (1928)
The Old Corral (1936)
The Old Country (1921)
The Old Country Where Rimbaud Died (1977)
The Old Curiosity Shop: (1911, 1914, 1921, 1934, 1984 & 2007)
The Old Dark House: (1932 & 1963)
The Old Doctor's Humanity (1912)
Old Dog (2011)
Old Dogs (2009)
The Old Donkey (2010)
Old English (1930)
Old Enough (1984)
Old Faithful (1935)
Old Fashioned (2015)
An Old Fashioned Boy (1920)
An Old-Fashioned Girl (1949)
An Old Fashioned Thanksgiving (2008)
The Old Fashioned Way (1934)
An Old-Fashioned Young Man (1917)
The Old Folks at Home (1916)
The Old Fool (1923)
The Old Footlight Favorite (1908)
The Old Forester House (1956)
The Old Fritz (1928)
The Old Frontier (1950)
The Old Garden (2006)
Old Glory (1939)
The Old Grey Hare (1944)
Old Gringo (1989)
The Old Guard: (1934, 1960, & 2020)
Old Heidelberg: (1915, 1923, & 1959)
Old Henry (2021)
Old Home Week (1925)
The Old Homestead: (1915, 1922, 1935, & 1942)
Old Ironsides (1926)
The Old Jar Craftsman (1969)
Old Joy (2007)
Old King Cole (1933)
The Old Lady (1932)
The Old Lady and the Pigeons (1997)
The Old Lady Who Walked in the Sea (1991)
An Old Love (1959)
Old Loves and New (1926)
Old MacDonald Duck (1941)
Old MacDonald Had a Farm (1946)
The Old Maid: (1939 & 1972)
The Old Maid's Valentine (1900)
The Old Man: (1931 & 2012)
The Old Man of Belem (2014)
The Old Man & the Gun (2018)
The Old Man of the Mountain (1933)
The Old Man and the Sea: (1958, 1990 TV & 1999)
The Old Man and the Seymour (2009)
The Old Man Who Cried Wolf (1970)
The Old Man Who Read Love Stories (2001)
The Old Mill (1937)
The Old Mill on Mols (1953)
The Old Mill Pond (1936)
Old Monk (2022)
The Old Monk's Tale (1913)
Old Mother Riley (1937)
Old Mother Riley in Business (1941)
Old Mother Riley Detective (1943)
Old Mother Riley Headmistress (1950)
Old Mother Riley at Home (1945)
Old Mother Riley Joins Up (1940)
Old Mother Riley Overseas (1943)
Old Mother Riley in Paris (1938)
Old Mother Riley in Society (1940)
Old Mother Riley, MP (1939)
Old Mother Riley's Circus (1941)
Old Mother Riley's Ghosts (1941)
Old Mother Riley's Jungle Treasure (1951)
Old Mother Riley's New Venture (1949)
The Old Nest (1921)
The Old New Year (1981)
The Old Oak Blues (2000)
An Old, Old Tale (1968)
The Old Oregon Trail (1928)
The Old People (2011)
Old San Francisco (1927)
Old School (2003)
The Old School of Capitalism (2009)
Old School New School (2011)
The Old Scoundrel (1932)
Old Shatterhand (1964)
The Old Skinflint (1942)
The Old Soak (1926)
Old Soldiers Never Die (1931)
The Old Song (1930)
An Old Sweetheart of Mine (1923)
The Old Swimmin' Hole: (1921 & 1940)
The Old Testament (1962)
The Old Texas Trail (1944)
An Old-Time Nightmare (1911)
The Old Wallop (1927)
The Old Way (2023)
Old Well (1987)
The Old West (1952)
The Old Wives' Tale (1921)
The Old Wyoming Trail (1937)
Old Yeller (1957)
The Old and the Young King (1935)
The Old Young People (1962)
Oldboy: (2003 & 2013)
Older than America (2008)
Oldest Living Confederate Widow Tells All (1994 TV)
The Oldest Profession (1967)

Ole–Oly

Olé Olé Olé!: A Trip Across Latin America (2016)
Ole Rex (1961)
Oleanna (1994)
Oleg (2019)
Olesya (1971)
Olga: (2004 & 2021)
Olga, la hija de aquella princesa rusa (1972)
Oli Vilakku (1968)
Le olimpiadi dei mariti (1960)
Olive (1988 TV)
The Olive Harvest (2003)
Olive Juice (2001)
Olive Oyl for President (1948)
The Olive Tree: (1975 TV & 2016)
Oliver! (1968)
Oliver and the Artful Dodger (1972)
Oliver & Company (1988)
Oliver the Eighth (1934)
Oliver Twist: (1909, 1912 American, 1912 British, 1916, 1919, 1922, 1933, 1948, 1974, 1982 Australian, 1982 American-British, 1997 TV & 2005)
Oliver Twist, Jr. (1921)
Oliver's Story (1977)
Olives and Their Oil (1914)
Olivia: (1951 & 1983)
Olivier, Olivier (1992)
Ollie Hopnoodle's Haven of Bliss (1988)
Olly Olly Oxen Free (1978)
Oloibiri (2016)
Olsen's Big Moment (1933)
Los Olvidados (1950)
Olympia: (1938, 1998 & 2011)
Olympia 52 (1952)
The Olympic Champ (1942)
Olympic Dreams (2019)
The Olympic Elk (1952)
Olympic Games (1927)
The Olympic Hero (1928)
Olympic Honeymoon (1940)
Olympics 40 (1980)
Olympus Has Fallen (2013)
Olympus Inferno (2008)

Om

Om: (1995, 2003 & 2018)
Om 3D (2013)
Om Allah (2012)
Om-Dar-B-Dar (1988)
Om Jai Jagadish (2002)
Om Namo Venkatesaya (2017)
Om Shakti (1982)
Om Shanthi Om (2015)
Om Shanti (2010)
Om Shanti Om (2007)

Oma-Omp

Oma Irama Penasaran (1976)
Omagh (2004)
The Omaha Trail (1942)
Omana (1972)
Omanakkunju (1975)
Omanakuttan (1964)
Omar (2013)
Omar Gatlato (1976)
Omar Khaiyyam (1946)
Omar Khayyam (1957)
Omar Killed Me (2011)
Omar & Salma (2007)
Omar the Tentmaker (1922)
Ombak Rindu (2011)
Ombattane Dikku (2022)
Ombre (1980)
Ombre su Trieste (1952)
Ombre sul Canal Grande (1951)
Ombyte av tåg (1943)
Omega (2008)
The Omega Code (1999)
Omega Cop (1989)
Omega Doom (1996)
The Omega Man (1971)
Omen (2003)
The Omen series:
The Omen: (1976 & 2006)
Omen II (1978)
Omen III: The Final Conflict (1981)
Omen IV: The Awakening (1991 TV)
Omer Dadi Aur Gharwale (2012)
Omertà (2012)
Omerta (2017)
Omicidio all'italiana (2017)
Omicidio per appuntamento (1966)
Omicron (1963)
The Omission (2018)
Omkara: (2004 & 2006)
Omkaram (1997)
Omme Nishyabda Omme Yuddha (2019)
Omniboat: A Fast Boat Fantasia (2020)
Omnibus (1992)
Omnipresent (2017)
Omo Child: The River and the Bush (2015)
Omo Elemosho (2012)
Omo Ghetto (2020)
Omo Ghetto: The Saga (2020)
Omoi, Omoware, Furi, Furare (2020 live-action & 2020 anime)
Omoo-Omoo, the Shark God (1949)
Omphalos (2014)
Ompong Galapong: May Ulo, Walang Tapon (1988)

On

Ön (1966)
On the 2nd Day of Christmas (1997 TV)
On Again-Off Again (1937)
On the Air (1934)
On the Air Live with Captain Midnight (1979)
On All Floors (2002)
On Any Sunday (1971)
On Any Sunday: Motocross, Malcolm, & More (2001)
On Approval: (1930, 1944 & 1964)
On aura tout vu (1976)
On the Avenue (1937)
On the Banks of Allan Water (1916)
On the Banks of the River Weser (1927)
On the Banks of the Wabash (1923)
On the Basis of Sex (2018)
On the Beach: (1959 & 2000 TV)
On the Beach at Night Alone (2017)
On the Beach by the Sea (1971)
On the Beat: (1962 & 1995)
On Beauty (2014)
On the Black Hill (1987)
On Board (1998)
On Body and Soul (2017)
On the Border (1930)
On Borrowed Time (1939)
On the Bowery (1956)
On the Brink of Paradise (1920)
On the Broad Stairway (1913)
On Broadway (2006)
On the Buses (1971)
On Chesil Beach (2018)
On a Clear Day (2005)
On a Clear Day You Can See Forever (1970)
On the Comet (1970)
On the Corner (2003)
On the Count of Three (2021)
On the Count of Zero (2007)
On with the Dance (1920)
On Dangerous Ground: (1915, 1917 & 1952)
On a Day of Ordinary Violence, My Friend Michel Seurat... (1996)
On Deadly Ground (1994)
On the Divide (1928)
On the Doll (2010)
On the Double (1961)
On the Downlow (2004)
On - drakon (2015)
On Dress Parade (1939)
On the Edge: (1986, 2001 & 2011)
On the Edge of Innocence (1997)
On the Far Side of the Tunnel (1994)
On the Fiddle (1961)
On the Fire (1919)
On the Friendly Road (1936)
On the Fringe (2022)
On the Front Page (1926)
On Golden Pond: (1981 & 2001 TV)
On the Great White Trail (1938)
On the Green Carpet (2001)
On Guard (1997)
On the Heights (1916)
On Her Majesty's Secret Service (1969)
On Her Shoulders (2018)
On the High Seas (1922)
On Hostile Ground (2000 TV)
On Ice (1935)
On the Ice (2011)
On the Inside (2010)
On an Island with You (1948)
On the Isle of Samoa (1950)
On the Job (2013)
On the Job Training (2008)
On the Jump (1918)
On a Knife Edge (2017)
On the Level: (1917 & 1930)
On Line: (2002 & 2015)
On the Line: (1984, 2001, 2007, 2011 & 2021)
On the Loose: (1931, 1951, 1984 & 1985)
On a Magical Night (2019)
On the Milky Road (2016)
On Moonlight Bay (1951)
On the Mountain of Tai Hang (2005)
On Murder Considered as One of the Fine Arts (1964)
On My Own (1991)
On My Skin: (2003 & 2018)
On My Way (2013)
On My Way to the Crusades, I Met a Girl Who... (1967)
On My Way Out: The Secret Life of Nani and Popi (2017)
On the Nameless Height (2003)
On Native Soil (2006)
On Next Sunday (2009)
On the Nickel (1980)
On the Night of the Fire (1939)
On the Night Stage (1915)
On the Nose (2001)
On the Occasion of Remembering the Turning Gate (2002)
On the Old Spanish Trail (1947)
On the Other Hand, Death (2008)
On the Other Side (2016)
On the Other Side of the Tracks (2012)
On Our Merry Way (1948)
On Our Own Land (1948)
On Our Selection: (1920 & 1932)
On the Outs (2004)
On the Path (2010)
On the Point of Death (1971)
On Probation: (1935, 1983 & 2005)
On purge bébé (1931)
On the Quiet (1918)
On Record (1917)
On the Red Cliff (1922)
On the Red Front (1920) 
On the Reeperbahn at Half Past Midnight: (1929, 1954 & 1969)
On the Right Track (1981)
On the Riviera (1951)
On the Road: (1936 & 2012)
On the Road: A Document (1964)
On the Road to Emmaus (2001)
On the Rocks (2020)
On the Roofs (1897)
On the Run: (1958, 1982, 1988, 1999 & 2002)
On se calme et on boit frais à Saint-Tropez (1987)
On Secret Service (1933)
On with the Show! (1929)
On the Silver Globe (1988)
On Stage Everybody (1945)
On Such a Night: (1937 & 1955)
On Suffocation (2013)
On the Sunny Side: (1942 & 1962)
On Their Own (1940)
On Thin Ice: (1925, 1933 & 1966)
On a Tightrope (2017)
On Time (1924)
On Tiptoe: Gentle Steps to Freedom (2000)
On Top (1982)
On the Top of the Cherry Tree (1984)
On Top of Old Smoky (1953)
On Top of the Whale (1982)
On Top of the World (1936)
On Tour: (1990 & 2010)
On the Town (1949)
On the Trail of the Bremen Town Musicians (1973)
On Trial: (1928 & 1939)
On Valentine's Day (1986)
On Velvet (1938)
On War (2008)
On the Waterfront (1954)
On Wings of Fire (1986)
On Wings of Love (1957)
On the Wrong Trek (1936)
On Your Back (1930)
On Your Mark (2021)
On Your Wedding Day (2018)
On Ze Boulevard (1927)

Ona–Onc

Onaaigal Jakkiradhai (2018)
Onaayum Aattukkuttiyum (2013)
Onan (2009)
Onappudava (1978)
Onbadhu Roobai Nottu (2007)
Onbadhule Guru (2013)
Once (2007)
Once Aboard the Lugger (1920)
Once Again (2012)
Once Around (1991)
Once Before I Die (1966) 
Once Bitten: (1932 & 1985)
Once Brothers (2010)
Once a Cop (1993)
Once Fallen (2010)
Once I Loved a Girl in Vienna (1931)
Once I Was a Beehive (2015)
Once I Will Return (1953)
Once in the Life (2000)
Once in a Lifetime: The Extraordinary Story of the New York Cosmos (2006)
Once More: (1988 & 1997)
Once Is Never (1955)
Once Is Not Enough (1975)
Once a Thief: (1935, 1950, 1965, 1991 & 1996 TV)
Once a Thief: Brother Against Brother (1997 TV)
Once a Thief: Family Business (1998 TV)
Once Upon a Brothers Grimm (1977)
Once Upon a Christmas (2000)
Once Upon a Crime (1992)
Once Upon a Dog (1982)
Once Upon a Dream (1949)
Once Upon a Forest (1993)
Once Upon a Girl (1976)
Once Upon a Halloween (2005)
Once Upon a Honeymoon: (1942 & 1956)
Once Upon a Line (2016)
Once Upon a Mirage (1982)
Once Upon a Mouse (1981)
Once Upon a Scoundrel (1974)
Once Upon a Texas Train (1988)
Once Upon a Time: (1918, 1933, 1944, 1973, 1994, 2008, 2013 & 2017)
Once Upon a Time in America (1984)
Once Upon a Time in Amritsar (2016)
Once Upon a Time in Anatolia (2011)
Once Upon a Time in a Battlefield (2003)
Once Upon a Time in Bihar (2015)
Once Upon a Time in Bolivia (2012)
Once Upon a Time in Brooklyn (2013)
Once Upon a Time in China series:
Once Upon a Time in China (1991)
Once Upon a Time in China II (1992)
Once Upon a Time in China III (1993)
Once Upon a Time in China IV (1993)
Once Upon a Time in China V (1994)
Once Upon a Time in China and America (1997)
Once Upon a Time, Cinema (1992)
Once Upon a Time in the East: (1974 & 2011) 
Once Upon a Time in High School (2004)
Once Upon a Time in Hollywood (2019)
Once Upon a Time in Hong Kong: (2021 & TBD)
Once Upon a Time in Kolkata (2014)
Once Upon a Time in Manila (1994)
Once Upon a Time in Mexico (2003)
Once Upon a Time in the Midlands (2002)
Once Upon a Time in Mumbaai (2010)
Once Upon a Time in the Northeast (2017)
Once Upon a Time in the Oued (2005)
Once Upon a Time in Phuket (2012)
Once Upon a Time in the Provinces (2008)
Once Upon a Time in Queens (2013)
Once Upon a Time in Rio (2008)
Once Upon a Time in Seoul (2008)
Once Upon a Time in Shanghai: (1998 & 2014)
Once Upon a Time in Tibet (2010)
Once Upon a Time in Triad Society (1996)
Once Upon a Time in Venice (2017)
Once Upon a Time in Vietnam (2013)
Once Upon a Time Was I, Verônica (2012)
Once Upon a Time in the West (1968)
Once Upon a Time...When We Were Colored (1996)
Once Upon a Time in the Woods (2006)
Once Upon a Wheel (1971)
Once Upon Another Time (2000)
Once Upon ay Time in Mumbai Dobaara! (2013) 
Once Upon a Time There Was a Singing Blackbird (1970)
Once Were Brothers: Robbie Robertson and the Band (2019)
Once Were Warriors (1994)

Ond

Ond Chance Kodi (2015)
Ondagi Balu (1989)
Ondagona Baa (2003)
Ondalla Eradalla (2018)
Ondanondu Kaladalli (1978)
Onde (2005)
Onde Balliya Hoogalu (1967)
Onde Estás Felicidade? (1939)
Onde Guri (1983)
Onde Roopa Eradu Guna (1975) 
Ondine (2010)
Ondre Kulam (1956)
Ondrupattal Undu Vazhvu (1960)
Ondu Cinema Kathe (1992)
Ondu Hennu Aaru Kannu (1980)
Ondu Kshanadalli (2012)
Ondu Motteya Kathe (2017)
Ondu Muttina Kathe (1987)
Ondu Premada Kathe (1977)

One

One: (2009, 2013, & 2017)
The One: (2001 & 2003)
One 2 Ka 4 (2001)
One Against All (1927)
One A.M. (1916)
One Angry Man (2010)
One Arabian Night (1923)
One Armed Boxer (1971)
One Armed Swordsman Against Nine Killers (1976)
One Away (1976)
One Bad Knight (1938)
One Big Affair (1952)
One Big Hapa Family (2010)
One Big Holiday (2011)
One Body Too Many (1994)
One Breath: (2015 & 2020)
One Brief Summer (1970)
One Bright Shining Moment: The Forgotten Summer of George McGovern (2005)
One Bullet Is Enough (1954)
One Cab's Family (1952)
One Can't Always Tell (1913)
One Chance (2013)
One Christmas (1994)
One Clear Call (1922)
One Colombo Night (1926)
One Crazy Ride (2009)
One Crazy Summer (1986)
One Crowded Night (1940)
One Cut of the Dead (2017)
One Cut Two Cut (2022)
One Dark Night (1983)
One Day in Europe (2005)
One Day in September (1999)
One Deadly Summer (1983)
One Direction: This Is Us (2013)
One Dollar, The Price of Life (2002)
One & Done (2016)
One Down, Two to Go (1982)
One and Eight (1983)
One Eight Seven (1997)
One False Move (1992)
One Fine Day (1996)
One Fine Morning (2022)
One Fine Spring Day (2001)
One Flew Over the Cuckoo's Nest (1975)
One Foot in Heaven (1941)
One Froggy Evening (1955)
One Good Cop (1991)
One Good Turn: (1931, 1936, 1951 & 1955)
One from the Heart (1982)
One Heavenly Night (1931)
One Hour Photo (2002)
One Hour in Wonderland (1950 TV)
One Hour with You (1932)
One Hundred Men and a Girl (1937)
One Hundred and One Dalmatians (1961)
One Hundred Years of Evil (2010)
One Last Dance: (2003 & 2006)
One Last Thing... (2006)
One Leg Kicking (2001)
One Little Indian (1973)
The One I Love (2014)
One Magic Christmas (1985)
One Man Band (2005)
One Man and His Cow (2016)
The One-Man Band (1900)
One Million B.C. (1940)
One Million Years B.C. (1966)
One Minute to Nine (2007)
One Missed Call: (2003 & 2008)
One for the Money (2012)
One More River (1934)
One More Time: (1931, 1970 & 2015)
One More Tomorrow (1946)
One More Train to Rob (1971)
One Night Husband (2003)
One Night with the King (2006)
One Night of Love (1934)
One Night at McCool's (2001)
One Night Only: (2008 & 2016)
One Night Stand: (1984, 1997 & 2016)
One Night Stud (2015)
One Night in Miami... (2020)
One Night in the Tropics (1940)
One Night with You: (1932 & 1948)
The One and Only (1978, 1999 & 2002)
The One and Only, Genuine, Original Family Band (1968)
The One and Only Ivan (2020)
One of Our Aircraft Is Missing (1942)
One of Our Dinosaurs is Missing (1975)
One Perfect Day: (2004 & 2013)
One Piece films:
One Piece: The Movie (2000)
One Piece The Movie: Clockwork Island Adventure (2001)
One Piece The Movie: Chopper's Kingdom on the Island of Strange Animals (2002)
One Piece The Movie: Dead End no Bōken (2003)
One Piece: The Cursed Holy Sword (2004)
One Piece Movie: The Desert Princess and the Pirates: Adventures in Alabasta (2007)
One Piece Film: Strong World (2009)
One Piece Film: Z (2012)
One Piece Film Gold (2016)
One Piece: Stampede (2019)
One Potato, Two Potato (1964)
One for the Road: (2003, 2009, 2014 & 2021)
One Russian Summer (1973)
One Second (2020)
One Shot (2005)
One Song a Day Takes Mischief Away (1970)
One Step Away (2014)
One Touch of Venus (1948)
One True Thing (1998)
One & Two (2015)
One Way (2006)
One Way Street (1950)
One Way Ticket: (1935, 1988, 1997 TV, & 2008)
One Week: (1920 & 2008)
One Week and a Day (2016)
One Week Friends (2017)
One Wonderful Sunday (1947)
One, Two, Three (1961)
One: The Movie (2005)
One-Armed Swordsman (1967)
One-Eyed Jacks (1961)
One-Eyed Monster (2008)
One-Trick Pony (1980)
One-Way Ticket to Mombasa (2002)
OneChanbara (2008)
Onegin (2000)
The Ones Below (2015)

Ong–Onl

Ong-Bak series:
Ong-Bak: Muay Thai Warrior (2003)
Ong Bak 2 (2008)
Ong Bak 3 (2010)
Ongka's Big Moka (1974)
Ongole Gittha (2013)
Oni Ise Owo (2007)
Onibaba (1964)
Onibi (1997)
Onibi Kago (1957)
Onimasa (1982)
The Onion Field (1980)
Onion From the Boot of a Benz (2015)
The Onion Movie (2008)
Onionhead (1958)
Onkel Bill fra New York (1959)
Onks' Viljoo näkyny? (1988)
Only 38 (1923)
Only Angels Have Wings (1939)
Only the Animals (2019)
Only the Brave: (1930, 1994, 2006 & 2017)
Only Clouds Move the Stars (1998)
Only Fools Rush In (2022)
The Only Game in Town (1970)
The Only Girl (1933)
Only God Forgives (2013)
Only God Knows (2006)
The Only Good Indian (2009)
Only Human: (2004 & 2010)
The Only Living Boy in New York (2017)
Only the Lonely (1991)
Only Lovers Left Alive (2013)
Only with Married Men (1974 TV)
The Only One: (1952 & 2006)
Only One Night: (1922, 1939 & 1950)
Only People (1957)
The Only Road (1918)
Only Saps Work (1930)
The Only Son: (1914, 1936 & 2016)
Only the Strong (1993)
The Only Thing (1925)
The Only Thing You Know (1971)
The Only Thrill (1997)
Only Two Can Play (1962)
Only the Valiant: (1940 & 1951)
The Only Way: (1927, 1970 & 2004)
Only When I Larf (1968)
Only When I Laugh (1981)
The Only Witness (1990)
The Only Woman (1924)
Only Yesterday: (1933 & 1991)
Only You: (1992, 1994, 2011, & 2015)

Onm–Ony

Onmyoji (2004)
Onmyōji 2 (2003)
Onna no Ana (2014)
Onna Babo (2002)
Onna Gokuakuchō (1970)
Onna no Hosomichi: Nureta Kaikyo (1980)
Onna Irukka Kathukanum (1992)
Onna Keirin-ō (1956)
Onna no Koyomi (1954)
Onna Tachiguishi-Retsuden (2006)
Onnaam Muhurtham (1991)
Onnam Prathi Olivil (1985)
Onnaman (2002)
Onnanam Kunnil Oradi Kunnil (1985)
Onnanu Nammal (1984)
Onninu Purake Mattonnu (1988)
Onnelliset leikit (1964)
Onningu Vannengil (1985)
Onnu Chirikku (1983)
Onnu Muthal Poojyam Vare (1986)
Onnu Randu Moonnu (1986)
Onnum Mindatha Bharya (1984)
Onnum Mindathe (2014)
Onnum Onnum Moonu (2015)
Onoda: 10,000 Nights in the Jungle (2021)
Ononto Prem (1977)
Onsdagsväninnan (1946)
Ontari (2008)
Ontari Poratam (1989)
Onti (2019)
Onti Salaga (1989)
Ontmaskerd (1915)
Ontrouw (1911)
Onward (2020)
Onward Christian Soldiers (1918)
Onye Ozi (2013)

Oo

Oo Na, Mahal Na Kung Mahal (1999)

Ood-Ooz

Oodi Oodi Uzhaikanum (2020)
The Oogieloves in the Big Balloon Adventure (2012)
Ooh... diese Ferien (1958)
Ooh La La La (2012)
Ooh... You Are Awful (1972)
Ooha (1996)
Oohakachavadam (1988)
Oohalu Gusagusalade (2014)
Oolkatal (1979)
Oollo Pelliki Kukkala Hadavidi (2018)
Oomai Vizhigal (1986)
Oomakkuyil (1983)
Oomakkuyil Padumbol (2012)
Oomana Thinkal (1983)
Oomappenninu Uriyadappayyan (2002)
Oonch Neech Beech (1989)
Oonche Log: (1965 & 1985)
Oonga (2013)
Oonjaal (1977)
Ooops! Noah is Gone... (2015)
Ooparwala Jaane (1977)
Oops! (2003)
Oor Mariyadhai (1992)
Oorantha Sankranthi (1983)
Oorige Upakari (1982)
Oorkavalan (1987)
Oorlog en vrede (1918)
Oormakale Vida Tharu (1980)
Ooru Vittu Ooru Vanthu (1990)
Ooruki Monagadu (1981)
Oorukichchina Maata (1981)
Oorukku Oru Pillai (1982)
Oorukku Uzhaippavan (1976)
Ooruku Nooruper (2003)
Oorum Uravum (1982)
Oorummadi Brathukulu (1976)
Oos Raat Ke Baad (1969)
Oosaravelli (2011)
Oothikachiya Ponnu (1981)
Oottyppattanam (1982)
Ooty (1999)
Ooty Varai Uravu (1967)
Ooyala (1998)
Oozham (2016)

Op

Op een Avond in Mei (1937)
Op Hoop van Xegen: (1918, 1924 & 1934)
Op Stap (1935)
Op stap door Amsterdam (1919)

Opa–Ope

Opa! (2005)
Opal Dream (2006)
Opasniye Povoroty (1962)
Open: (2011 & 2019)
Open All Night: (1924 & 1934)
Open City (2008)
Open Doors (1990)
The Open Doors (2004)
Open Fire: (1989 & 1994)
Open Grave (2013)
Open Heart (2012)
An Open Heart (2012)
Open Hearts (2002)
Open House (1987, 2004 & 2010)
The Open House (2018)
Open Range: (1927 & 2003)
Open Season (1974)
Open Season series:
Open Season (2006)
Open Season 2 (2008)
Open Season 3 (2010)
Open Season: Scared Silly (2015)
An Open Secret (2014)
Open Water (2003)
Open Water 2: Adrift (2006)
Open Windows (2014)
Open Your Eyes: (1919 & 1997)
Open Your Window (1953)
Opened by Mistake (1940)
Opening Day of Close-Up (1996)
Opening of the Kiel Canal (1895)
The Opening of Misty Beethoven (1965)
Opening Night: (1977 & 2016)
Opera (1987)
Opera Ball: (1939 & 1956)
Opera House (1961)
Opera Jawa (2006)
Operacja Himmler (1979)
Operation Agneepath (TBD)
Operation Alamelamma (2017)
Operation Amsterdam (1959)
Operation Antha (1995)
Operation Arapaima (TBD)
Operation Atlantis (1965)
Operation Autumn (2012)
Operation Avalanche (2016)
Operation Bikini (1963)
Operation Bottleneck (1961)
Operation Bullshine (1959)
Operation Chromite (2016)
Operation C.I.A. (1965)
Operation Concrete (1955)
Operation Counterspy (1965)
Operation Crossbow (1965)
Operation Cupid (1960)
Operation Dames (1959)
Operation Daybreak (1975)
Operation Delilah (1967)
Operation Delta Force series:
Operation Delta Force (1997 TV)
Operation Delta Force 2: Mayday (1997 TV)
Operation Delta Force 3: Clear Target (1999)
Operation Delta Force 4: Deep Fault (1999)
Operation Delta Force 5: Random Fire (2000)
Operation Diamond Racket (1978)
Operation Diplomat (1953)
Operation Duryodhana (2007)
Operation Duryodhana 2 (2013)
Operation Dumbo Drop (1995)
Operation E (2012)
Operation Edelweiss (1954)
Operation Eichmann (1961) 
Operation Finale (2018)
Operation Fortune: Ruse de guerre (2022)
Operation Gold Fish (2019)
Operation Gold Ingot (1962)
Operation Happy New Year (1996)
Operation Haylift (1950)
Operation Homecoming: Writing the Wartime Experience (2007) 
Operation Jackpot Nalli C.I.D 999 (1969)
Operation Leopard (1980)
Operation Mad Ball (1957)
Operation Malaya (1953)
Operation Manhunt (1954)
Operation Mata Hari (1968)
Operation Mekong (2016)
Operation Mincemeat (2021)
Operation Mitra (1951)
Operation Murder (1957)
Operation Nam (1986)
Operation Pacific (1951)
Operation Petticoat (1959)
Operation Poker (1965)
Operation Red Sea (2018)
Operation Secret (1952)
Operation Shmenti Capelli (2011)
Operation Snatch (1962)
Operation St. Peter's (1967)
Operation Stadium (1977)
Operation Stogie (1959)
Operation Swallow: The Battle for Heavy Water (1948)
Operation Teutonic Sword (1958)
Operation Thunderbolt (1977)
Operation Valkyrie: The Stauffenberg Plot to Kill Hitler (2008)
Operation Vittles (1948)
Operation Warzone (1988)
Operation Y and Shurik's Other Adventures (1965)
Operation: Endgame (2012)
Operation: Rabbit (1952)
Operator (2015 & 2016)
The Operator (2000)

Opf–Opu

Opfergang (1944)
Ophelia: (1963 & 2018)
Opie Gets Laid (2005)
Opium: (1919 & 1949)
Opium: Diary of a Madwoman (2007)
Opium and the Kung-Fu Master (1984)
Opium War (2008)
The Opium War (1997)
Oppai Volleyball (2009)
Oppam (2016)
Oppam Oppathinoppam (1986)
Oppanda (2022)
Oppenheimer (2023)
Oppol (1981)
The Opponent: (1988 & 2000)
The Opportunists (1960)
Opportunity (1918)
Opportunity Knocks (1990)
Opposite Day (2009)
The Opposite Sex: (1956 & 2014) 
The Opposite Sex and How to Live with Them (1993)
The Opposite of Sex (1998)
Opposites Attract (1990 TV)
Oprah Winfrey Presents: Mitch Albom's For One More Day (2007)
The Opry House (1929) 
Optical Illusions (2009)
An Optimistic Tragedy (1963)
The Optimists (2006)
The Optimists of Nine Elms (1974)
Opus IV (1925)
Opus Zero (2017)

Or

Or Iravu (1951)
Or (My Treasure) (2004)

Ora–Orc

Ora (2011)
Ora Charjon (1988)
Ora Egaro Jon (1972)
Ora Pro Nobis (1917)
Ora Thake Odhare (1954)
Oraalppokkam (2014)
The Oracle (1953)
Orage (1938)
Oral Koodi Kallanayi (1964)
Oral Mathram (1997)
Oram Po (2007)
Orange: (2010, 2012, 2015 & 2018)
Orange Blossom (1932)
Orange County (2002)
Orange Mittai (2015)
Orange Revolution (2007)
The Orange Sky (2006)
Orange Valley (2018)
Orange Winter (2007)
The Oranges (2011)
Oranges and Sunshine (2010)
Oranje Hein: (1925 & 1936)
Orayiram Kinakkalal (2018)
Orbis Pictus (1997)
Orca (1977)
The Orchard End Murder (1980)
Orchestra Wives (1942)
Orchids and Ermine (1927)
Orchids, My Intersex Adventure (2010)
Orchids and My Love (1966)
Orchids to You (1935)

Ord–Org

The Ordeal (2005)
Ordeal in the Arctic (1993 TV)
Ordeal by Innocence (1984)
The Ordeal of Rosetta (1918)
The Order: (2001 & 2003)
The Order of the Black Eagle (1987)
The Order of Myths (2008)
Order Order Out of Order (2019)
Orders Are Orders (1955) 
Orders Is Orders (1933)
Orders to Kill (1958)
Ordet (1955)
Ordinary (2012)
Ordinary Guys (2017)
Ordinary Decent Criminal (2000)
Ordinary Heroes: (1986 TV & 1999)
Ordinary Love (2019)
An Ordinary Love Story (2012)
Ordinary Magic (1993)
An Ordinary Man (2017)
An Ordinary Miracle: (1964 & 1978)
Ordinary People: (1980 & 2009)
The Ordinary Radicals (2008)
Ordinary World (2016)
Ore 10: lezione di canto (1955)
Ore Kadal (2007)
Ore Mukham (2016)
Ore Oru Gramathiley (1989)
Ore Raththam (1987)
Ore Rektham (1985)
Ore Thooval Pakshikal (1988)
Ore Vaanam Ore Bhoomi (1979)
Oregon Passage (1957)
Oregon Trail (1945)
The Oregon Trail: (1936 & 1959)
Oregon Trail Scouts (1947)
The Oregonian (2011)
Les Oreilles (2008)
Oresama (2004)
Organ (1996)
The Organization (1971) 
Organized Crime & Triad Bureau (1994)
The Organizer (1963)
Orgasm Inc. (2009)
Orgasmic Birth: The Best-Kept Secret (2008)
Orgasmo (1969)
Orgazmo (1997)
Orgy of the Dead (1965)

Ori

Oriana (1985)
Oridathoru Phayalvaan (1981)
Oridathoru Postman (2010)
Oridathoru Puzhayundu (2008)
Oridathu (1987)
Orient: (1924 & 1928)
Orient Express: (1927, 1934, 1943, 1944, 1954 & 2004)
Orient Fever (1923)
Oriental Nights (1960)
Oriental Port (1950)
Orientation: A Scientology Information Film (1996)
Oriented (2015)
The Origin of Evil (2022)
Origin: Spirits of the Past (2006)
Original (2009)
Original Gangstas (1996)
The Original Kings of Comedy (2000)
Original Sin: (1992 & 2001)
The Original Sin (1948)
The Originals (2017)
Orikkal Koodi (1981)
Orikkal Oridathu (1985)
Orion (2015)
Orion's Belt (1985)
Orissa (2013)
Oriundi (2000)
Oriyan Thoonda Oriyagapuji (2015)
Oriyardori Asal (2011)
Orizuru Osen (1935)

Ork–Orr

Orkkappurathu (1988)
Orkkuka Vallappozhum: (1978 & 2009)
Orlando (1992)
Orlean (2015)
Orma Mathram (2011)
Ormakal Marikkumo (1977)
Ormakalundayirikkanam (1995)
Ormakkayi (1982)
Ormayil Nee Maathram (1979)
Ormayundo Ee Mukham (2014)
Ormen (1966)
Ornette: Made in America (1985)
Oro (2016)
Oro Diablo (2000)
Oro rojo (1978)
Oro Viliyum Kathorthu (1998)
Orochi (1925)
Orochi, the Eight-Headed Dragon (1994)
Orosia (1944)
Orozco the Embalmer (2001)
Orphan: (2009 & 2016)
The Orphan (1960)
The Orphan of Anyang (2001)
Orphan of the Ghetto (1954)
Orphan of Lowood (1926)
Orphan of the Pecos (1937)
Orphan of the Sage (1928)
Orphan Train (1979 TV)
Orphan of the Wilderness (1936)
Orphan: First Kill (2022)
Orphan's Benefit (1934)
An Orphan's Tragedy (1955)
The Orphanage: (2007 & 2019)
The Orphanage of Iran (2016)
Orphans (1987 & 1998)
Orphans of Apollo (2008)
Orphans of the Genocide (2014)
Orphans of Happiness (1922)
Orphans of the Storm (1922)
Orphans of the Street (1938)
Orpheus (1949)
Orpheus Descending (1990)
Orquesta Típica (2005)
Orr Eravuu (2010)

Oru–Orw

Oru Abhibhashakante Case Diary (1995)
Oru Adaar Love (2019)
Oru Black and White Kudumbam (2009)
Oru CBI Diary Kurippu (1988)
Oru Cheru Punchiri (2000)
Oru Cinemakkaran (2017)
Oru Indhiya Kanavu (1983)
Oru Indian Pranayakadha (2013)
Oru Iyakkunarin Kadhal Diary (2017)
Oru Kadankatha Pole (1993) 
Oru Kaidhiyin Diary (1985)
Oru Kal Oru Kannadi (2012)
Oru Kalluriyin Kathai (2005)
Oru Kanniyum Moonu Kalavaanikalum (2014)
Oru Katha Oru Nunakkatha (1986)
Oru Kidayin Karunai Manu (2017)
Oru Kochu Bhoomikulukkam (1992)
Oru Kochu Swapnam (1984)
Oru Kochukatha Aarum Parayatha Katha (1984)
Oru Kudakeezhil (1985)
Oru Kudumba Chithram (2012)
Oru Kuppai Kathai (2018)
Oru Kuprasidha Payyan (2018)
Oru Kuttanadan Blog (2018)
Oru Madapravinte Katha (1983)
Oru Malarin Payanam (1985)
Oru Maravathoor Kanavu (1998)
Oru Marubhoomikkadha (2011)
Oru Maymasa Pulariyil (1987)
Oru Mexican Aparatha (2017)
Oru Minnaminunginte Nurunguvettam (1987)
Oru Modhal Oru Kadhal (2014)
Oru Mugathirai (2017)
Oru Mukham Pala Mukham (1983)
Oru Murai Vanthu Parthaya (2016)
Oru Mutham Manimutham (1997) 
Oru Muthassi Gadha (2016)
Oru Muthassi Katha (1991)
Oru Naal Innoru Naal (1985)
Oru Naal Iravil (2015)
Oru Naal Koothu (2016)
Oru Naal Oru Kanavu (2006)
Oru Naal Varum (2010)
Oru Nadigai Natakam Parkiral (1978)
Oru Nadigaiyin Vaakkumoolam (2012)
Oru Nalla Naal Paathu Solren (2018)
Oru New Generation Pani (2015)
Oru Nokku Kanan (1985)
Oru Odai Nadhiyagirathu (1983)
Oru Oodhappu Kan Simittugiradhu (1976)
Oru Oorla (2014)
Oru Oorla Oru Rajakumari (1995)
Oru Oorla Rendu Raja (2014)
Oru Painkilikatha (1984)
Oru Pakka Kathai (2020)
Oru Pazhaya Bomb Kadha (2018)
Oru Penninte Katha (1971)
Oru Pennum Randaanum (2008)
Oru Poi (2016)
Oru Ponnu Oru Paiyan (2007)
Oru Raagam Pala Thaalam (1979)
Oru Sandesam Koodi (1985)
Oru Sayahnathinte Swapnam (1989)
Oru Second Class Yathra (2015)
Oru Sindoora Pottinte Ormaykku (1987)
Oru Small Family (2010)
Oru Sumangaliyude Katha (1984)
Oru Sundariyude Katha (1972)
Oru Swakaryam (1983)
Oru Thaai Makkal (1971)
Oru Thalai Ragam (1980)
Oru Thayin Sabhatham (1987)
Oru Thira Pinneyum Thira (1982)
Oru Vadakkan Selfie (2015)
Oru Vadakkan Veeragatha (1989)
Oru Varsham Oru Maasam (1980)
Oru Vasantha Geetham (1994)
Oru Veedu Oru Ulagam (1978)
Oru Velladu Vengaiyagiradhu (1980)
Oru Vidukadhai Oru Thodarkadhai (1979)
Oru Vilippadakale (1982)
Oru Viral (1965)
Oru Visheshapetta Biriyani Kissa (2017)
Oru Yaathrayude Anthyam (1991)
Oru Yamandan Premakadha (2019)
Oru Yathramozhi (1997)
Oru Yathrayil (2013)
Oru Yugasandhya (1986)
Orukkam (1990)
Orun Mooru (1982)
Oruththi (2003)
Oruvar Vaazhum Aalayam (1988)
Orwell Rolls in His Grave (2003)

Os

Os Dias Com Ele (2013)
Os Famosos e os Duendes da Morte (2009)
Os Faroleiros (1920)
Os Homens São de Marte... E é pra Lá que Eu Vou! (2014)
Os Maias (Alguns) Episódios da Vida Romântica (2014)
Os Olhos da Ásia (1996)
Os Trapalhões series:
Os Trapalhões e o Mágico de Oróz (1984)
Os Trapalhões e o Rei do Futebol (1986)
Os Trapalhões na Guerra dos Planetas (1978)
Os Trapalhões no Reino da Fantasia (1985)
Os Verdes Anos (1963)
Osa kryvei i nychta (1964)
Osadeni Dushi (1975)
Osai (1984)
Osaka Elegy (1936)
Osaka Story (1999)
An Osaka Story (1957)
Osaka Tough Guys (1995)
Osama (2003)
The Oscar (1966)
Oscar: (1967 & 1991)
Oscar and Lucinda (1997)
Oscar and the Lady in Pink (2009)
Oscar Wilde (1960)
Oscuro Animal (2016)
Oscuros Rinocerontes Enjaulados (1990)
Osean: (1990 & 2003)
Oslo, August 31st (2011)
The Oslo Diaries (2018)
Osmosis Jones (2001)
Un Oso Rojo (2002)
Osru Diye Lekha (1972)
Ossessione (1943)
Ossos (1997)
The Osterman Weekend (1983)
Ostia (1970)
Osuofia in London (2003)

Ot

Otaku Unite! (2004)
Otan leipei i gata (1962)
Otello: (1906 & 1986)
Otesánek (2000)
Othello: (1922, 1951, 1956, 1965 Australian, 1965 British, 1980, 1990, 1995, 2001 & 2017)
The Other: (1913, 1930, 1972 & 1999)
The Other Boleyn Girl: (2003 TV & 2008)
The Other End of the Line (2008)
The Other F Word (2011)
The Other Final (2003)
The Other Guys (2010)
The Other Half: (1919, 2006 & 2016)
The Other Half of the Sky: A China Memoir (1975)
The Other Hell (1981)
The Other Kind of Love (1924)
The Other Lamb (2019)
The Other Love (1947)
The Other Lover (1985)
The Other Man: (1916 & 2008)
Other Men's Shoes (1920)
Other Men's Wives (1919)
Other Men's Women (1931)
The Other One (2008)
The Other One: The Long Strange Trip of Bob Weir (2015)
Other People (2016)
The Other People (1968)
Other People's Children (1958)
Other People's Relatives (1956)
Other People's Money (1991)
Other People's Sins (1931)
The Other Shoe (2001)
The Other Side: (1931, 2006, 2012 & 2015)
The Other Side of AIDS (2004)
The Other Side of the Bed (2002)
The Other Side of Heaven (2001)
The Other Side of Heaven 2: Fire of Faith (2019)
The Other Side of Hope (2017)
The Other Side of Midnight (1977)
The Other Side of the Mirror (2007)
The Other Side of the Mountain (1975)
The Other Side of the Mountain Part 2 (1978)
The Other Side of Paradise (1953)
The Other Side of Sunday (1996)
The Other Side of the Underneath (1972)
The Other Side of the Wind (2018)
The Other Sister (1999)
Other Voices: (1970 & 2000)
The Other Woman: (1921, 1924, 1931, 1954, 1983 TV, 1995 TV, 2009 & 2014)
Other Women's Husbands (1926)
Otherhood (2019)
The Others: (1974 & 2001)
Otis (2008)
Otley (1968)
Otogirisō (2001)
Otoko no Isshō (2014)
Otomo (1999)
Otōto (2010)
Ott Tänak: The Movie (2019)
Otta Nanayam (2005)
Ottaal (2015)
Ottakkayyan (2007)
Ottamuri Velicham (2017)
Ottayadipathakal (1993)
Ottayal Pattalam (1991)
An Otter Study (1912)
Otto – Der Film (1985)
The Ottoman Lieutenant (2017)

Ou

Oua–Oui

Ouaga-Saga (2004)
Oui (1996)
Ouija: (2003, 2007, 2014 & 2015)
Ouija: Origin of Evil (2016)
Ouija 4 (2015)
Ouija House (2018)

Our

Our Agent Tiger (1965)
Our Barrio (2016)
Our Beautiful Days (1955)
Our Beloved (2018)
Our Beloved Month of August (2008)
Our Better Selves (1919)
Our Betters (1933)
Our Blood Will Not Forgive (1964)
Our Blushing Brides (1930)
Our Body (2018)
Our Boy (1936)
Our Brand Is Crisis: (2005 & 2015)
Our Children (2012)
Our Country (2006)
Our Country Cousin (1914)
Our Crazy Aunts (1961)
Our Crazy Aunts in the South Seas (1964)
Our Crazy Nieces (1963)
Our Curse (2013)
Our Daily Bread: (1929, 1934, 1949 & 2005)
Our Dancing Daughters (1928)
Our Daughter (1981)
Our Day (1938)
Our Day Out (1977, TV)
Our Day Will Come (2010)
Our Diary (2017)
Our Disappeared (2008)
Our Doctor is the Best (1969)
Our Earthmen Friends (2006)
Our Emden (1926)
Our Enemy — The Japanese (1943)
Our Everyday Life (2015)
Our Family (2014)
Our Family Wedding (2010)
Our Father: (1953, 2015 & 2016)
Our Fathers (2005, TV)
Our Feature Presentation (2008)
Our Fighting Navy (1937)
Our Forbidden Places (2008)
Our Fragrance (2003)
Our Friend (2019)
Our Friend Tili (1981)
Our Friend, Martin (1999)
Our Friends, the Hayseeds (1917)
Our Futures (2015)
Our Gang (1922)
Our Gang Follies of 1936 (1935)
Our Gang Follies of 1938 (1937)
Our Generation (2010)
Our Girl Friday (1953)
Our Grand Despair (2011)
Our Happy Lives (1999)
Our Hearts Were Growing Up (1946)
Our Hearts Were Young and Gay (1944)
Our Heavenly Bodies (1925)
Our Homeland (2012)
Our Hospitality (1923)
Our House: (2006 TV & 2018) 
Our House in Cameroon (1961)
Our Huff and Puff Journey (2014)
Our Huge Adventure (2005, direct-to-video)
Our Idiot Brother (2011)
Our Italian Husband (2004)
Our Kind of Traitor (2016)
Our Lady of the Assassins (2000)
Our Lady of Sorrows (1934)
Our Land (2006)
Our Leading Citizen: (1922 & 1939)
Our Lips Are Sealed (2000)
Our Little Sister (2015)
Our Love (2000)
Our Man Flint (1966)
Our Man in Havana (1960)
Our Man in Tehran (2013)
Our Men in Bagdad (1966)
Our Miss Brooks (1956)
Our Mother's House (1967)
Our Relations (1936)
Our School (2009)
Our Shining Days (2017)
Our Son, the Matchmaker (1996, TV)
Our Song (2000)
Our Sons (1991, TV)
Our Souls at Night (2017)
Our Story (1984)
Our Time: (1974 & 2018)
Our Times (2015)
Our Town: (1940, 2003 & 2007)
Our Twisted Hero (1992)
Our Very Own: (1950 & 2005)
Our Wife: (1931 & 1941)
Ouran High School Host Club (2012)
Ourselves Alone (1936)

Out–Ouw

Out: (1957, 1982, 2002 & 2017) 
Out 1 (1971)
Out of Africa (1985)
Out All Night: (1927 & 1933)
Out of the Blue: (1931, 1947, 1980, 2002 & 2006)
Out of the Blue: Live at Wembley (1980)
Out California Way (1946)
Out Cold: (1989 & 2001)
Out of Control: (1985, 2002, 2003 & 2017)
Out of the Darkness: (1971 & 1985)
Out of Death (2021)
Out of the Furnace (2013)
Out for Justice (1991)
Out for a Kill (2003)
Out of My Intention (2008)
Out of Order: (1987 & 1997)
Out of the Past (1947)
Out of Reach (2004)
Out to Sea (1997)
Out of Sight (1998)
Out of Time: (1988 & 2003)
Out West: (1918 & 1947)
Out of the Wilderness (2001 TV)
The Out-of-Towners: (1970 & 1999)
Outback Revenge (2012)
Outback Vampires (1987)
Outbreak (1995)
Outcast: (1917, 1922, 1928, 1937, 2010 & 2014)
The Outcast: (1934 & 1954)
An Outcast Among Outcasts (1912)
The Outcasts: (1982, 2007 & 2017)
The Outfield (2015)
The Outfit: (1973 & 2022)
Outfoxed: Rupert Murdoch's War on Journalism (2004)
The Outing (1987)
Outkast (2001)
Outland (1981)
Outlander (2008)
Outlaw: (1999 & 2007)
The Outlaw: (1939, 1943 & 2010)
The Outlaw Josey Wales (1976)
Outlaw King (2018)
Outlaws and Angels (2016)
The Outlaws Is Coming (1965)
Outpost: (1944, 1959 & 2008)
Outpost: Black Sun (2012)
Outpost: Rise of the Spetsnaz (2013)
The Outpost: (1995 & 2020)
Outrage: (1950, 1973 TV, 1998 TV, 2009 & 2010)
The Outrage: (1964 & 2011)
Outrageous! (1977)
Outside (2004)
Outside the Law: (1920, 1930, 1937, 1956, 2002 & 2010)
The Outside Man (1972)
Outside Providence (1999)
Outside the Wall (1950)
Outsider: (1997 & 2012)
The Outsider: (1917, 1926, 1931, 1939, 1948, 1961, 1980, 1981, 1998 TV, 2002, 2005, 2014, 2018, 2019 & 2021)
The Outsiders (1983)
Outsourced (2006)
Ouw Peh Tjoa (1934)

Ov

Over 21 (1945)
Over the Border: (1922, 1950 & 2006)
Over the Brooklyn Bridge (1984)
Over the Dark Water (1992)
Over the Edge (1979)
Over-Exposed (1956)
Over the Fence: (1917, 2009, & 2016)
Over the Garden Wall: (1919, 1934 & 1950)
Over the Goal (1937)
Over the Hedge (2006)
Over Her Dead Body (2008)
Over the Hill: (1917, 1931 & 1992)
The Over the Hill Band (2009)
Over the Hill to the Poorhouse (1920)
The Over-the-Hill Gang (1969 TV)
The Over-the-Hill Gang Rides Again (1970 TV)
An Over-Incubated Baby (1901)
Over the Moon: (1939 & 2020)
Over My Dead Body: (1942, 1995, 2012 Canadian & 2012 South Korean)
Over the Odds (1961)
Over da Rainbow (2008)
Over the Rainbow (2002)
Over the River...Life of Lydia Maria Child, Abolitionist for Freedom (2007)
Over Run Over (2016)
Over the Santa Fe Trail (1947)
Over She Goes (1937)
Over stork og stein (1994)
Over There (1917)
Over Tissa (1958)
Over the Top: (1918 & 1987)
Over the Wall (1938)
Over the Waves (1950)
Over Your Cities Grass Will Grow (2010)
Over Your Dead Body (2014)
Overboard: (1987 & 2018)
The Overbrook Brothers (2009)
The Overcoat: (1926, 1952, 1959 & unfinished)
Overcomer (2019)
Overdrawn at the Memory Bank (1983 TV)
Overdrive (2017)
The Overeater (2003)
Overexposed (1990)
Overheard series:
Overheard (2009)
Overheard 2 (2011)
Overheard 3 (2014)
Overhill (2013)
Overland Adventure (1954)
Overland to Deadwood (1942)
Overland with Kit Carson (1939)
The Overland Limited (1925)
Overland Mail (1942)
Overland Mail Robbery (1943)
Overland Pacific (1954)
Overland Red (1920)
Overland Riders (1946)
The Overland Stage (1927)
Overland Stage Raiders (1938)
Overland Stagecoach (1942)
Overland Telegraph (1951)
The Overland Telegraph (1929)
Overland Trails (1948)
The Overlanders (1946)
Overlord: (1975 & 2018)
Overman (2015)
Overnight: (1985 & 2003)
The Overnight (2015)
Overnight Delivery (1998)
Overnight Sensation (1932)
The Overnighters (2014)
Overpass (2015)
Override (1994)
An Oversimplification of Her Beauty (2012)
The Overtaxed (1959)
Overture: (1958 & 1965)
The Overture (2004)
Overture to The Merry Wives of Windsor (1953)
Overvallers in de Dierentuin (1984)
Ovunque sei (2004)
Ovy's Voice (2017)

Ow–Oz

Owd Bob: (1924, 1938 & 1998)
Owl (2003)
The Owl: (1927 & 1991)
The Owl vs Bombo (1984)
The Owl and the Pussycat (1970)
Owl and the Sparrow (2007)
The Owl Who Married a Goose: An Eskimo Legend (1974)
The Owner (2012)
Owners (2019)
The Owners (2014)
The Owners (2020)
Owning Mahowny (2003)
Owzat (1997)
The Ox (1991)
The Ox-Bow Incident (1943)
The Oxbow Cure (2013)
Oxford Blues (1984)
The Oxford and Cambridge University Boat Race (1895)
Oxford Gardens (2015)
The Oxford Murders (2008)
Oxhide (2005)
Oxyana (2013)
Oxygen: (1999, 2009, 2010, 2017, 2020 & 2021)
Oy! (2009)
Oy Vey! My Son Is Gay!! (2009)
Oye! (2009)
Oye Ninne (2017)
Oye Hoye Pyar Ho Gaya (2013)
Oye Kuch Kar Guzar (2016)
Oye Lucky! Lucky Oye! (2008)
Oyee (2016)
The Oyster Dredger (1915)
Oyster Farmer (2004)
The Oyster Princess (1919)
Oyster Village (1972)
Oysters at Nam Kee's (2002)
Oz (1976)
Oz the Great and Powerful (2013)
An Ozark Romance (1918)
Ozark Sharks (2016 TV)
Ozhivudivasathe Kali (2015)
Ozhivukaalam (1985)
OzLand (2014)
Ozzy (2016)

Previous:  List of films: M    Next:  List of films: P

See also
 Lists of films
 Lists of actors
 List of film and television directors
 List of documentary films
 List of film production companies

-